= List of former or dissident Mormons =

This is a list of well-known Mormon dissidents or other members of the Church of Jesus Christ of Latter-day Saints (LDS Church) who have either been excommunicated or have resigned from the church – as well as of individuals no longer self-identifying as LDS and those inactive individuals who are on record as not believing and/or not participating in the church. While the church doesn't regularly provide information about excommunication or resignation, those listed here have made such information public. In a very few cases, the list below may include former adherents of other Latter Day Saint movement denominations who have ceased identifying as members of the Church, as well.

See: List of Latter-day Saints for current members of the LDS Church.

== Former and inactive members ==
Phil Cunningham

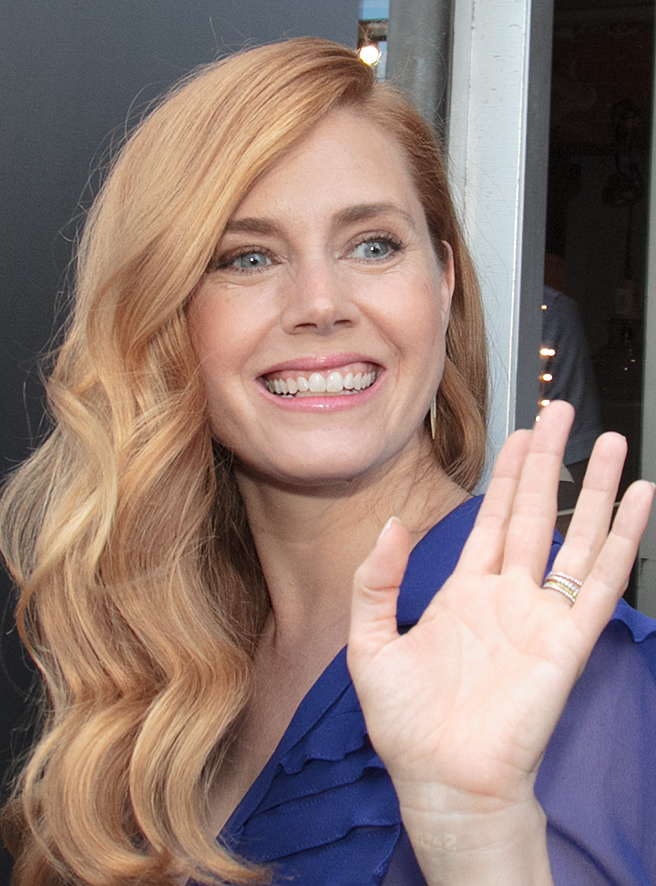
Amy Adams

=== Artists, actors, and entertainment figures ===
- Kevin Abstract, rapper, singer-songwriter, director, and founding member of Brockhampton
- Amy Adams, actress known for roles in Enchanted, Doubt, The Fighter

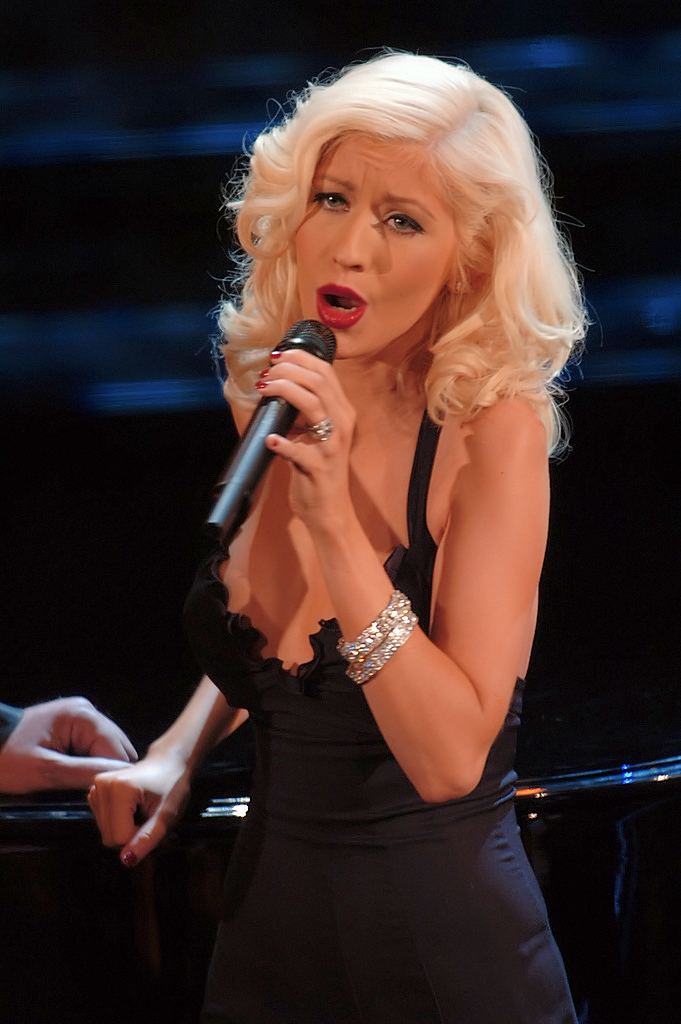
The singer Aguilera in a 2006 performance

- Christina Aguilera is a singer who was raised in an LDS home but Aguilera has not self-identified as Mormon.
- Corbin Allred, American actor. He starred in the motion picture Saints and Soldiers and the 1997–1998 television series Teen Angel.
- David Archuleta, American pop singer
- Hal Ashby, director of New Hollywood films such as Shampoo and Being There
- Tal Bachman, son of Randy Bachman (Bachman-Turner Overdrive) and Canadian musician known for his 1999 hit song, "She's So High"
- Randy Bachman, Canadian musician and founder of The Guess Who and Bachman-Turner Overdrive
- Belladonna, American pornographic actress
- Dustin Lance Black, screenwriter and producer, 2009 Oscar for Best Screenplay for Milk
- Benson Boone, American singer known for Beautiful Things and Mystical Magical
- Gutzon Borglum, sculptor most noted for the heads of U.S. presidents on Mount Rushmore
- Wilford Brimley, actor known for Cocoon, The Firm, Quaker Oats commercials, and Liberty Medical "diabeetus" meme
- Win Butler, frontman for the band Arcade Fire
- Ed Catmull, animation pioneer and president of Pixar and Walt Disney Animation
- Johnny Cunningham, brother of Phil, and member of Silly Wizard
- Phil Cunningham, Scottish folk musician, member of Silly Wizard
- Cytherea, American pornographic actress.
- Brian Keith Dalton, the creator, producer and main character of Mr Deity. He coined the term "Formon" for "former Mormon" in 1996.
- Eliza Dushku, actress known for roles in Buffy the Vampire Slayer, Tru Calling, Dollhouse
- Richard Dutcher, independent filmmaker and actor known for films God's Army, God's Army 2: States of Grace, Brigham City
- Aaron Eckhart, Golden Globe Award-nominated actor known for roles in Thank You for Smoking, The Dark Knight, Erin Brockovich
- Mindy Gledhill, singer songwriter
- Tyler Glenn, lead singer for the American rock band Neon Trees
- Ryan Gosling, Academy Award-nominated actor known for roles in Half Nelson, The Notebook, Drive
- Leigh Harline, Hollywood composer, known most notably for "When You Wish Upon a Star"
- Annette Haven, American former pornographic actress
- Katherine Heigl, American actress
- Jessica Holmes, Canadian comedian
- Julianne Hough, dancer, actress, singer, songwriter
- Neil LaBute, playwright
- Bert McCracken, of the rock band The Used
- Jennette McCurdy is the author of I'm Glad My Mom Died, and acted in the sitcom iCarly.
- David Petruschin is a drag queen with the stage name "Raven" and was raised Mormon.
- Sue-Ann Post, Australian comedian
- Kevin Rahm, actor known for his television roles as Kyle McCarty on Judging Amy, Lee McDermott on Desperate Housewives, and Ted Chaough on Mad Men
- Dan Reynolds (singer), singer for rock band Imagine Dragons
- Wayne Sermon, guitarist for rock band Imagine Dragons
- Will Swenson, actor and singer
- Brendon Urie, of rock band Panic! at the Disco
- Janet Varney, American actress and podcaster
- Paul Walker, actor known for role in The Fast and the Furious film series
- Alex Winters, BBC children's TV presenter
- La Monte Young, composer and musician.
- Mahonri Young, sculptor and grandson of Brigham Young
- Warren Zevon, singer/songwriter

=== Business figures ===
- Bruce Bastian, businessman and philanthropist, co-created WordPerfect software.
- Nolan Bushnell, founder of Atari and Chuck E. Cheese
- George S. Eccles, CEO of First Security Bank and philanthropist
- Marriner Eccles, CEO of First Security Bank and Chairman of the Federal Reserve System
- Jim Jannard, sunglasses designer and founder of Oakley, Inc.
- Bryan Johnson (entrepreneur), Founder of Braintree, Venmo and Kernel
- Wilson McCarthy, head of the Denver & Rio Grande Railroad

=== Sports figures ===
- Merlin Olsen, NFL star turned TV star
- Mark Schultz (wrestler), Olympic Wrestling Champion.
- Benji Schwimmer, the winner of the 2006 So You Think You Can Dance show.

=== Scholars ===
- Wayne C. Booth, American literary critic and professor of English
- Paul D. Boyer, biochemist and Nobel Laureate
- William Jasper Kerr, president of Oregon Agricultural College (now Oregon State University) from 1907 to 1932
- Spencer L. Kimball, dean of the University of Utah law school, son of Mormon prophet Spencer W. Kimball
- Kip Thorne, theoretical physicist and Nobel Laureate
- Lynn Wilder, Christian author and former Brigham Young University (BYU) professor who has written an ex-Mormon memoir

=== Politics ===
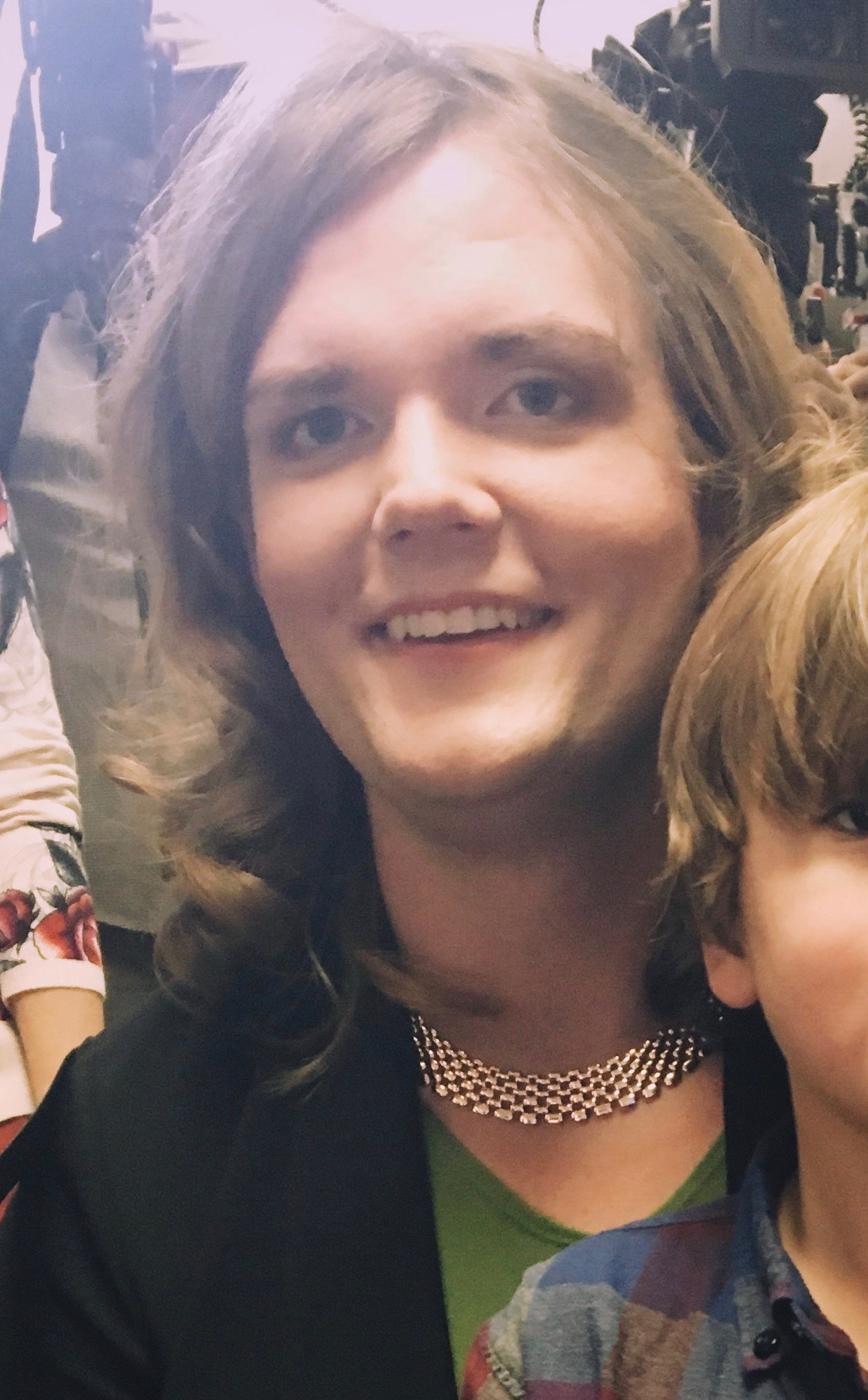
Former Mormon Misty Snow ran as the first transgender person nominated by a major party for the U.S. Senate.
- Rocky Anderson, 33rd mayor of Salt Lake City, Utah, 2000–2008
- Jacinda Ardern, Prime Minister New Zealand, 2017–2023
- Frank J. Cannon, U.S. Senator from Utah
- Jim Dabakis, Utah state senator.
- James "Bo" Gritz, controversial former United States Army Special Forces officer
- Abby Huntsman, political commentator and great-granddaughter of Apostle David B. Haight
- Jon Huntsman Jr., former Utah governor, former U.S. Ambassador to Singapore, China, and Russia, and grandson of Apostle David B. Haight
- Sonia Johnson, feminist activist.

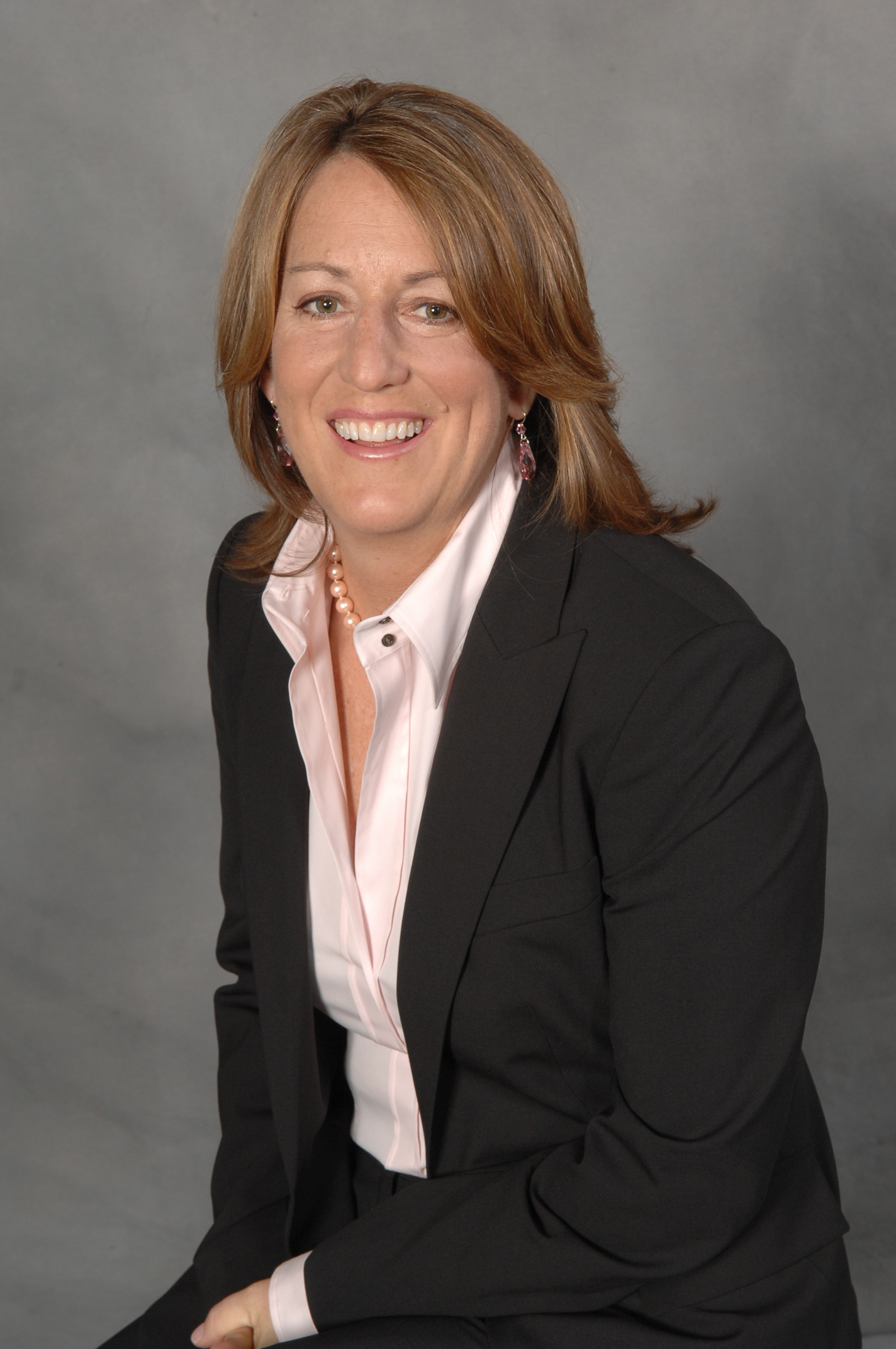
National Center for Lesbian Rights executive director Kate Kendell

- Kate Kendell, attorney and activist, former director of National Center for Lesbian Rights.
- Alfred W. McCune, railroad builder, mine operator, and politician
- Sterling McMurrin, U.S. Commissioner of Education in the Kennedy administration, provost of the University of Utah, and philosopher
- Culbert Olson, twenty-ninth governor of California
- Esther Peterson, Assistant Secretary of Labor in the Kennedy administration and consumer advocate
- Pro-Life (born Marvin Richardson), politician known for his opposition to abortion and for changing his name to reflect his views
- Calvin Rampton, three-term Utah governor
- Marco Rubio, U.S. Secretary of State and former Senator from Florida
- Brent Scowcroft, National Security Adviser to multiple U.S. Presidents
- Carrie Sheffield, writer and political analyst
- Kyrsten Sinema, U.S. Senator from Arizona
- Misty Snow, political candidate; first transgender nominee for a major U.S. political party to the nation's Senate
- Obert C. Tanner, founder of the O.C. Tanner Company, philanthropist, and philosophy professor
- Morris Udall, Arizona Congressman and presidential candidate
- Stewart Udall, Secretary of the Interior in the Kennedy and Johnson administrations, Arizona congressman, environmental activist, attorney, and author
- Tom Udall, U.S. Senator for New Mexico
- Jenny Wilson (politician), Salt Lake County Mayor
- Ted Wilson (mayor), former Salt Lake City mayor
- Carl Wimmer, member of the Utah House of Representatives from 2006 to 2012

=== Miscellaneous ===
- Heather Armstrong, blogger, dooce.com
- Martha Nibley Beck, daughter of Mormon scholar Hugh Nibley and author of bestseller Leaving the Saints: How I Lost the Mormons and Found My Faith.
- Steve Benson, cartoonist and grandson of LDS Church president Ezra Taft Benson
- Patrick Califia, sexuality writer
- Brian Evenson, American writer of literary and popular fiction
- Vardis Fisher, "Lost Generation" author of Children of God and the Testament of Man
- Laci Green sex educator and online video creator for Seeker and MTV.
- Alyssa Grenfell, American YouTuber and author.
- Johnny Harris, American journalist and YouTuber
- Alice Hoagland (1949–2020), American flight attendant and activist
- Carolyn Tanner Irish, bishop in the Episcopal Church in the United States of America
- Walter Kirn, literary editor of GQ
- Grant H. Palmer, lifelong employee of the Church Educational System and author of An Insider's View of Mormon Origins (2003)
- Levi Peterson, author of The Backslider
- Arthur Pratt, tenth child of LDS Apostle Orson Pratt and Sarah Pratt, deputy U.S. marshal
- Sarah M. Pratt, critic of plural marriage, first wife of Apostle Orson Pratt
- Jeremy Runnells, author of a widely-circulated letter critical of the LDS Church.
- Cara Santa Maria, American science correspondent and podcaster
- William Shunn, science fiction writer
- Julia Murdock Smith, adopted daughter of Joseph Smith
- Virginia Sorensen, "Lost Generation" novelist of A Little Lower Than The Angels
- Jerald and Sandra Tanner, writers, researchers and critics of the LDS Church
- Lynne Kanavel Whitesides, feminist

== Excommunicated members ==
- Lavina Fielding Anderson, scholar, writer, editor, and feminist posthumously reinstated by the LDS Church in 2024
- Martha Beck, sociologist, life coach, best-selling author, and columnist for O, The Oprah Magazine
- Arthur Gary Bishop, serial killer and child molester
- Fawn M. Brodie, biographer and history professor
- Jason Derek Brown, 489th fugitive to be placed on the FBI Ten Most Wanted list
- Ted Bundy, convicted serial killer and rapist
- John Dehlin, founder of the Mormon Stories podcast
- James J. Hamula, former LDS general authority
- Mark Hofmann, double murderer and an expert forger; "considered by forensic experts to be the best forger yet caught"
- Helmuth Hübener, opponent of the Third Reich; posthumously reinstated by the LDS Church in 1946
- Sonia Johnson, feminist and a Peace and Freedom Party presidential nominee
- Kate Kelly, lawyer and feminist, advocate of woman holding the priesthood
- Ogden Kraut, independent Mormon fundamentalist author
- Deborah Laake, wrote an ex-Mormon memoir.
- John D. Lee, executed for the Mountain Meadows Massacre and posthumously reinstated by the LDS Church in 1961
- George P. Lee, former LDS general authority, convicted child molester
- Bob Lonsberry, writer and talk radio host, expelled for "bad conduct" prior to 2001, has since rejoined
- Leonard Matlovich, Bronze Star Medal recipient and gay US Air Force veteran
- Richard McCoy Jr., hijacker of a United Airlines passenger jet for ransom in 1972
- Brent Lee Metcalfe, LDS historian
- Teresa Nielsen Hayden, essayist and science fiction editor, lapsed at time of excommunication
- Connell O'Donovan, American historian, biographer, and genealogist
- D. Michael Quinn, LDS historian
- Denver Snuffer, Utah lawyer and author of books on LDS doctrine
- Simon Southerton, molecular biologist
- Paul Toscano, attorney and author
- Dan Vogel, LDS historian
- George D. Watt, secretary to Brigham Young and compiler of the Journal of Discourses
- Ann Eliza Young, ex-wife of Brigham Young

== See also ==
- Category:Former Latter Day Saints
- Category:People excommunicated by the Church of Jesus Christ of Latter-day Saints
- Criticism of the Church of Jesus Christ of Latter-day Saints
- Culture of The Church of Jesus Christ of Latter-day Saints
- Ex-Mormon
- Exmormon Foundation
- Groups within Mormonism
- Irreligion
- List of former atheists and agnostics
- List of former Christians
  - List of former Protestants
  - List of former Roman Catholics
- List of former Muslims
- Mormon spectrums of orthodoxy and practice
- Non-denominational
- Spiritual but not religious
