= Mormon Stories Podcast =

Mormon podcast

- Genre: Mormon studies; LDS; social activism; Latter-day Saint history

Cast and voices
- Hosted by: John Dehlin (primary host)

Publication
- Original release: September 2005

Related
- Website: mormonstories.org

Mormon Stories Podcast is a podcast principally hosted by psychologist John Dehlin featuring interviews with individuals and occasionally scholars on Mormon topics. The podcasts are noted as a platform for individuals critical of the Church of Jesus Christ of Latter-day Saints (LDS Church), skeptic and dissident individuals.

== History ==
Mormon stories banner

In September 2005, after finding reasons to stay a member of the LDS Church despite a crisis of faith, John Dehlin created the Mormon Stories podcast as an open discussion of Mormon issues with the intention of giving listeners reasons to remain in the church. Through interviews, Mormon Stories focused on varying Mormon experiences and perspectives, including antagonistic, apologetic, intellectual, gay, black, fundamentalist, feminist, and dissenting. Several notable Mormon figures were guests on Mormon Stories, including Gregory Prince, Todd Compton, Grant H. Palmer, Darius Gray, Margaret Blair Young, Richard Bushman, and Margaret and Paul Toscano. Mormon Stories has been featured in many venues, including being broadcast on KVNU in Logan, Utah. In June 2007, John Dehlin was quoted for stories by The New York Times and Good Morning America, discussing Mitt Romney and Mormonism.

At times personally conflicted about continuing Mormon Stories, Dehlin stopped and restarted the project a few times. In January 2010, Dehlin resumed the blog and podcast, focusing on faith crises, mental illnesses, and notable guests, beginning with interviews of Joanna Brooks and John C. Hamer. Among numerous other regular hosts who have joined Dehlin in conducting interviews for the podcast were Dan Wotherspoon, former editor of Sunstone magazine, and Natasha Helfer Parker, a licensed clinical marriage and family therapist.

In 2015, Dehlin said Stories episodes had "tens of thousands" of listeners and that the webcast's "goal has always been to alleviate suffering. It's an act of love." In February 2026, Dehin stated that there were "nearly 300,000" subscribers.

Dehlin was excommunicated for apostasy by the LDS Church in 2015.

In 2016, the Open Stories Foundation reported Dehlin's 2017 salary and bonus was $82,500 and $27,000 respectively. Dehlin's compensation rose to over $226,000 in 2018, and $236,000 in 2019.

In 2026, the Church of Jesus Christ of Latter-day Saints sued the Mormon Stories Podcast alleging trademark and copyright infringement.

== Criticism ==
In 2013, a critical review of Mormon Stories by Gregory L. Smith was published in Interpreter: A Journal of Mormon Scripture. In the review, Smith alleges that "Dehlin is frequently uninformed of the often controversial material he discusses with interviewees, and that he promotes views hostile to the foundational beliefs of the Church of Jesus Christ of Latter-day Saints". The pending publication of the piece catalyzed within the Mormon studies community a discussion (referred to by some as the "Dehlin affair") about the roles of apologetic and non-faith-based scholarship, respectively, within the academic study of Mormonism by Mormons.

== Guests ==
Featured guests of the podcast include Latter-day Saints considered orthodox, "curious," doubters, and heretics. Guests have included a number of "NeverMos" (short for "never-Mormons") and former Mormons who have either backgrounds in "comparative religions/cults" or histories of being associated with the LDS Church without ever becoming members.

== See also ==
- Bloggernacle
- Blogs about Mormons and Mormonism
- Sunstone magazine
- Stay LDS
