= Mormon spectrums of orthodoxy and practice =

Mormon theology

Various spectrums of beliefs or practice within Mormonism account for categories of Mormons possessing faith or skepticism regarding various doctrine of the largest denomination in the Latter Day Saint movement, the Church of Jesus Christ of Latter-day Saints (LDS Church), or pertaining to issues of orthopraxy/heteropraxy, among those identifying as Mormon. People may also partake of Mormon culture to some degree as a result of having been raised in the LDS Church or else having converted and spent a large portion of their life as an active member of the LDS Church. Such "cultural" Mormons may or may not be actively involved with the church. In some cases they may not even be, or have ever been, official church members.

Many cultural Mormons possess a strongly Mormon identity and abide with an appreciation for the lessons and the love they have received in the course of long church membership. Cultural Mormons do not necessarily hold anti-Mormon sentiments and often support the goals of the church. Many retain a sense of Mormon identity for life.

Both secular and progressive Mormons are sometimes referred to as on the left side of the religious spectrums; the more typical mainstream Mormons, in the center; and religious Mormon dissidents who disagree with certain changes to "original teachings" within Mormonism, on the right. Segments of the right include both fundamentalist Mormons and dissidents who participate in the Remnant movement.

== Overview ==
The LDS Church tolerates a certain amount of disbelief in its doctrines and practices; but, in certain instances it might consider them grounds for disciplinary action.

LDS Church leaders teach that certain doubts can be resolved by "instruction, study, and prayer, which result in increased testimony, which drives out further doubts." However, disbelief in certain core doctrines (e.g., the role of Jesus as savior and redeemer, sustaining the leaders of the church as fulfilling their roles as prophets, seers, and revelators, etc.) can prevent a Mormon from participating in certain activities, such as priesthood ordinances and temple worship. Some Mormons keep doubts secret in order to participate in such activities or avoid conflict with family and friends.

Disciplinary action on the grounds of apostasy may result when a member of the LDS Church publicly opposes church doctrines.

== Internet communities ==
Fearing that divulging any heterodoxy may result in stigmatization by mainstream Latter-day Saints, some Mormons prefer anonymity. Many participate in Internet communities, where they can discuss their issues anonymously.

=== New Order Mormons ===
One such group refers to itself as the New Order Mormons, a name patterned on the term New Order Amish (Amish who maintain cultural ties to their religion while not accepting some of its core tenets). This is a group of current and former Mormons who no longer believe at least some of the tenets of the LDS Church, but because of family or cultural ties do not choose to completely separate themselves from the faith.

=== Humanistic Mormonism ===
Humanistic Mormonism is a movement of freethinkers, cultural Mormons, disfellowshipped or independents related to LDS Church and other Latter Day Saint groups that emphasize Mormon culture and history, but do not demand belief in a supernatural god, or the historicity of the Bible or the Book of Mormon.

== See also ==
- Antinomianism
- Bloggernacle
- Blogs about Mormons and Mormonism
- Cafeteria Christianity
- Criticism of the Church of Jesus Christ of Latter-day Saints
- Cultural Catholic
- Cultural Christian
- Cultural Judaism
- Cultural Muslim
- Culture of The Church of Jesus Christ of Latter-day Saints
- Ex-Mormon
- Exmormon Foundation
- Groups within Mormonism
- Humanistic Judaism
- Irreligion
- Jack Mormon
- Lapsed Catholic
- List of former or dissident LDS
- Moralistic therapeutic deism
- Non-denominational
- Off the derech (Orthodox Jewish expression)
- Spiritual but not religious
- Stay LDS
- Sunday Christian
