= Ex-Mormons =

Disaffiliate of The Church of Jesus Christ of Latter-day Saints

Ex-Mormons or post-Mormons are disaffiliates of Mormonism. The term—sometimes shortened to as exmo or postmo—usually refers to disaffiliates of the largest Mormon denomination, the Church of Jesus Christ of Latter-day Saints (LDS Church), and those individuals may neither believe in nor affiliate with the LDS Church. In contrast, Jack Mormons may believe but do not affiliate; and cultural Mormons may or may not affiliate but do not believe in certain doctrines or practices of the LDS Church. The distinction is important to a large segment of ex-Mormons, many of whom consider their decision to leave as morally compelling and socially risky. According to a 2026 study by the Pew Research Center, around half (46%) of US adults raised LDS disafilliate by adulthood. This is up from 2014 Pew data showing around 1/3 of adults raised LDS no longer adhere to the denomination (up from around 10% in the 1970s and 1980s), and in 2008 only 25% of LDS young adults were actively involved in the church. Two surveys taken across the state of Utah between 1980 and 1981, showed that for every five converts into Mormonism, there were two converts out. Many ex-Mormons experience troubles with family members who still follow Mormon teachings. Aggregations of ex-Mormons may comprise a social movement.

== Reasons for leaving ==
The foremost reasons are disbelief both in Joseph Smith as a prophet and in the Book of Mormon as a religious and historical document. Reasons for this disbelief include perceived issues with anthropological, linguistic, archaeological, and genetic evidence against the Book of Mormon in the New World. In addition to rejecting the Book of Mormon for such reasons, the Book of Abraham and other Mormon religious texts are rejected on similar grounds. A study of 3,000 people who were formerly affiliated with the LDS Church recorded that 74 percent of respondents cited a disbelief in church doctrine or theology as major reason for leaving the church, but only 4 percent of respondents cited conflict with other church members as a large factor in their decision to leave. Also, just 4 percent claimed that a significant reason for apostasy was dissatisfaction with the rules of conduct professed by the LDS Church. This corroborates the assertion that many Mormons are satisfied with the communal aspect and attributes of LDS Church life. A 2023 survey of over 1,000 former church members in the Mormon corridor found the following top three reported reasons for disaffiliation: 1. History related to Joseph Smith; 2. The Book of Mormon; and 3. Race issues in the church.

Individuals leave Mormonism for a variety of reasons, although "single reason disaffiliates are rare among former Mormons." Research shows that 43 percent of ex-Mormon left due to unmet spiritual needs. Other reasons for leaving may include a belief that they are in a cult, logical or intellectual appraisal, belief changes or differences, spiritual conversion to another faith, life crises, and poor or hurtful responsiveness by Mormon leaders or congregations. Of former Mormons surveyed, 58 percent switched to other faiths or practices.

A common pattern among those who leave the Church of Jesus Christ of Latter-day Saints has been identified as the "Perpetual Cycle of Disaffection", described in the 2013 LDS Personal Faith Crisis Report. The cycle begins when a member encounters troubling historical or doctrinal information—often through personal study or online sources—that contradicts official church narratives. This discovery triggers cognitive dissonance, emotional distress, and a deep yearning to reconcile newly found facts with prior beliefs. As individuals seek answers, they may experience a lack of support or even ostracism from their faith community, leading to increased feelings of isolation and betrayal. The cycle often continues as members move from doubt to private study, to disengagement, and full disaffiliation. The report emphasized that these crises of faith are rarely driven by a desire to sin, but rather by a commitment to truth, integrity, and spiritual authenticity.

Those who adopt humanist or feminist perspectives may view certain Mormon doctrines (including past teachings on the spiritual status of black people, polygamy, and the role of women in society) as racist or sexist.

A minority of ex-Mormons cite their personal incompatibility with Mormon beliefs or culture. A 2003 Princeton Review publication quoted a student at church-owned Brigham Young University as stating, "the nonconformist will find a dull social life with difficulty finding someone that will be their friend, regardless of who they are or what they believe." Liberal views and political attitudes that challenge this conformity, and occasionally sexual orientation, are cited as reasons for leaving Mormonism.

In recent years, the LDS Church has become more politically active, particularly with regard to legislation barring civil marriage for same-sex couples. Official church involvement in the California Proposition 8 campaign was highly controversial, causing some Mormons to stop attending church.

== Post-disaffiliation issues ==
After their decision to leave Mormonism and the LDS Church, ex-Mormons typically go through an adjustment period as they re-orient their lives religiously, socially, and psychologically.

=== Religious ===
An online poll of ex-Mormons found that a majority of ex-Mormons do not self-identify as a member of another faith tradition, choosing to describe themselves as agnostic, atheist or simply ex-Mormon. Some can also become apatheist. A Pew Research report corroborated this, finding in 2015 that 36% of those born Mormon left the religion, with 21% of born Mormons (58% of ex-Mormons) now unaffiliated, 6% evangelical Protestant, and 9% converting to other Protestant, Catholic, or a non-Christian faith. Others either retained belief in God but not in organized religion or became adherents of other faiths. Among ex-Mormons with no current religious preference, 36 percent continued the practice of prayer often or daily.

Ex-Mormon attitudes toward Mormons and Mormonism vary widely. Some ex-Mormons actively proselytize against Mormonism, while some provide only support to others leaving the religion. Other ex-Mormons prefer to avoid the subject entirely, while still others may try to encourage healthy dialogue between adherents of their new faiths and active Mormons. Attitudes of ex-Mormons also differ regarding their church membership. Some formally resign by mailing resignation letters to request the removal of their church membership records, which the LDS Church refers to as "name removal", while others simply stop attending church services.

=== Social ===
Ex-Mormons who publicly leave Mormonism often face social stigmatization. Although many leave to be true to themselves or to a new belief structure, they leave at a cost; many leave feeling ostracized and pressured and miss out on major family events such as temple weddings. Family members of some may express only disappointment and sorrow and try to reach out in understanding to their new belief system or lack thereof. Some stay under threat of divorce from spouses who still believe. Still, many ex-Mormons have given up spouses, children, and the ability to enter Mormon temples to witness important life events of family members. Ex-Mormons in geographic locations away from major enclaves of Mormon culture such as Utah may experience less stigmatization, however.

=== Psychological ===
Many ex-Mormons go through a psychological process as they leave Mormonism. Former Mormon Bob McCue described his disaffiliation as recovery from cognitive dissonance. Reynolds reports that leaving involves a period of intense self-doubt and depression as disaffiliates confront feelings of betrayal and loneliness, followed by self-discovery, belief exploration, spiritual guidance and connection as they leave Mormonism. He argues that leaving may provide a renewed sense of self, confidence and peace. One ex-Mormon compared his disaffiliation experience to leaving a cult, while others called it close to overcoming mind control or adjusting to life outside of religious fundamentalism. Still others compare their symptoms to divorce from marriage. Ex-Mormons may also have to cope with the pain of ostracism by Mormon employers, friends, spouses, and family members.

== Ex-Mormon organizations ==
Many formerly LDS individuals seek community and discussion about their former beliefs in online and in-person groups. Some of these international groups include the ex-Mormon page on Reddit (with over 300,000 subscribers) as well as various group listings on the Mormon Spectrum website. Localized groups include the SLC Postmos meetup and Facebook group (with over 2,000 members) and Utah Valley Postmos meetup and Facebook group (over 900 members). The ex-Mormon subreddit gained publicity with its involvement leaking LDS documents.

== Demographics ==
According to a BYU Studies article, as of 2014, about one-third of those with a Latter-day Saint background have left the Church. Of those who leave the Church, about 58% switch to no religion or unaffiliated; 18% switch to evangelical Protestant groups; 8% went to Mainline Protestant denominations; 10% went to generic Christianity; and 6% went to "other". The Community of Christ appeals to some disaffiliates from the LDS Church given their related but distinctive histories.

== See also ==
- Religious disaffiliation
- Exmormon Foundation
- Exvangelical
- Lost boys (Mormon fundamentalism)
- Lapsed Catholic
- List of former or dissident LDS
- Stay LDS
- Blogs about Mormonism or Mormons
- Category:People excommunicated by the Church of Jesus Christ of Latter-day Saints
- Ed Decker
