= Stay LDS / Mormon =

Mormon blog

Stay LDS
- Website type: Independent LDS pastoral self-help and discipleship Blog
- Available in: English
- Owner: John Dehlin; Brian Johnston
- Creators: John Dehlin, Brian Johnston, Ray Degraw, et al.
- Website: www.staylds.com
- Launched: January 2009; 17 years ago
- Current status: Inactive

Stay LDS / Mormon ("Latter-day Saint") is a collaborative blog featuring discussion and commentary about Mormon issues, beliefs, culture, thought and current events. It was created by Brian Johnston and John Dehlin, formerly of the Sunstone Education Foundation.

The blog's primary focus is issues of concern to Mormons experiencing disaffection or crisis of their faith. The individual contributors may share their own experiences to provide an informal support group.

== See also ==
- Mormon blogosphere
- Criticism of the Church of Jesus Christ of Latter-day Saints
- Culture of The Church of Jesus Christ of Latter-day Saints
- Exmormon Foundation
- List of former or dissident LDS
