= Southern California Mormon Choir =

Choir from Southern California in the United States

Southern California Latter-day Saint Choir
- Choir
- Origin: Southern California
- Founded: 1953 (73 years ago)
- Founder: H. Frederick Davis
- Members: 80-100
- Music director: Jan Bills
- Headquarters: Glendale, California; United States
- Website: scldsc.org//

The Southern California Latter-day Saint Choir (formerly the Southern California Mormon Choir) is a choir based in Southern California that was formed in 1953 under the auspices of The Church of Jesus Christ of Latter-day Saints.

== Description ==
Former logo of the Southern California Latter-day Saint Choir

The choir performs concerts of classical, sacred, folk, patriotic, and popular choral music throughout the Southern California area.

The choir was organized by H. Frederick Davis (1909-2000), a Tonga-born, New Zealand raised Latter-day Saint.

The current director is Jan Bills, a professional harpist with a degree in music from Brigham Young University.

== See also ==
- Culture of The Church of Jesus Christ of Latter-day Saints
