= Molly Mormon =

Mormon stereotype

Molly Mormon (sometimes abbreviated/stylized as MoMo or MOMO) is a term for a popular stereotype of a devout female lay member of the Church of Jesus Christ of Latter-day Saints (LDS Church). A Molly Mormon is thought to embody the "perfect Mormon woman" an attractive and chaste woman whose life revolves around the family and marriage and the social demands of Mormonism, such as bearing multiple children, and who embodies the cheery, chipper, and domesticated female in Latter-day Saint culture. Typically, a Molly Mormon would not dissent against her husband or the priesthood and supports Mormon social and political views unconditionally. Peter Priesthood is the male version of the same term, though used somewhat less frequently. Many "Molly Mormons" are stereotyped as being gullible, being consumed by their life within the church and hence out-of-touch with the reality outside it.

These terms are occasionally used in a disparaging way by members of the LDS church to refer to other Mormons who display or promote a traditional interpretation of their understanding of the church's teachings. An example of a person that may be labeled this way is one who abstains from drinking caffeinated cola drinks (based on a conservative interpretation of an ambiguity in the Word of Wisdom), will not watch television on Sunday, tells on her 15-year-old friend for dating before age 16, and who insists that others do so as well, perhaps claiming to be "setting an example". Abstinence from these behaviors is not required by the church to remain as a member in good standing, but is often preached unofficially as interpretations of church teachings in lessons taught by members of the church's local leadership.

== Usage ==
The term "Molly Mormon" can take on both positive and negative connotations, depending on who is using it, and toward whom. When used by or toward teens, it can refer to prudish behavior. When it refers to an adult LDS woman, it often refers to a stereotype which may or may not be welcome.

The term is used sometimes amongst members of the Church, and has even appeared in a magazine published by the LDS church—in the phrase "they had taunted her and called her a 'Molly Mormon' because she would not participate in their questionable activities", which appeared in a 1989 edition of The Ensign.

The term is often simply abbreviated to "Molly" (or sometimes to "Momo") or used as an adjective: "She's gotten so molly lately—all she could say about these new shorts is that they were too short."

== Commercialization ==
A company calling itself Shameless Humor sells a line of clothing, including T-shirts and underwear, bearing the name "Molly Mormon".

A series of paperback romance novels written by LDS fiction author Tamra Norton has also appropriated the term into the series' title. Books in the series include Molly Mormon?, Molly Married?, and Molly Mommy?, and follow a Mormon girl named Molly through her teens on to married student life at BYU Idaho and then on to parenthood.

== See also ==
- Anticipatory socialization
- LDS cinema, also known as "Mollywood"
- Jack Mormon
