= CES Letter =

2013 open critique of the LDS Church

A Letter to a CES Director
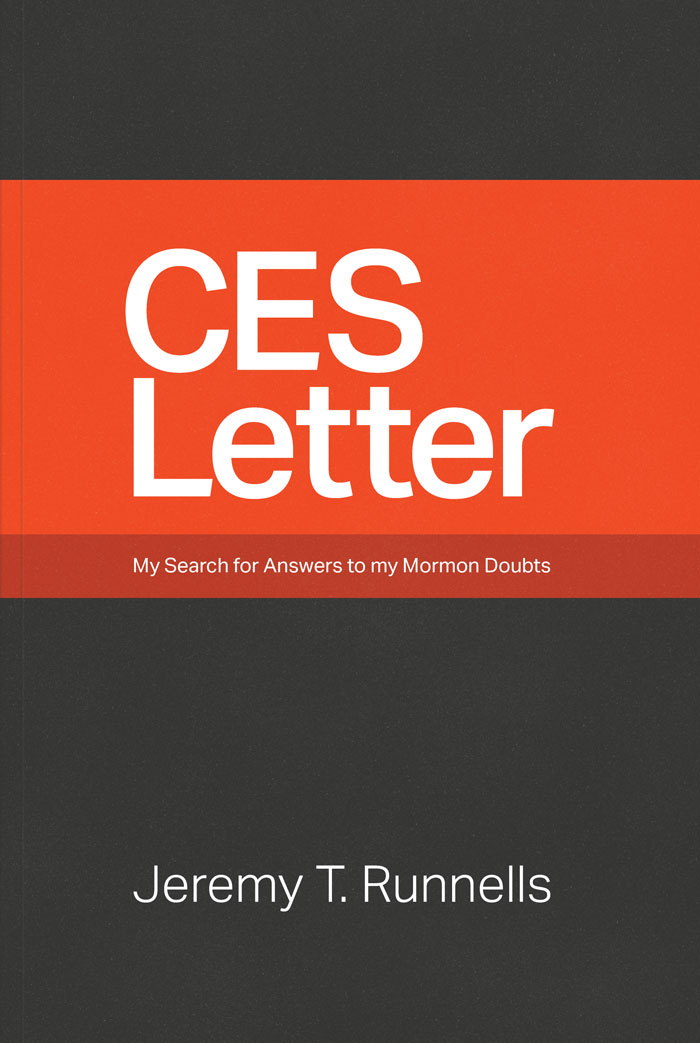
- Author: Jeremy Runnells
- Language: English
- Subject: Historical criticism of the LDS Church
- Publication date: April 2013 (version 1); October 2017 (version 2)
- Publication place: United States
- Pages: 84
- Website: cesletter.org

A Letter to a CES Director, later renamed CES Letter, is an open letter critical of the Church of Jesus Christ of Latter-day Saints (LDS Church).

In 2012, Jeremy Runnells began to experience doubts over his faith. An institute director of the LDS Church's Church Educational System (CES) asked him to write his concerns, and in response Runnells sent an 84-page letter with his concerns and criticisms of the LDS Church. After not receiving a response, in April 2013 he posted his letter on the internet. The letter spread throughout the Mormon blogosphere and LDS Church communities and became one of the most influential sites providing the catalyst for many people leaving the LDS Church and resigning their membership.

The publicity from the CES Letter led Runnells to found the CES Letter Foundation, for which donations and paperback sales have allowed the CES Letter project to grow into a full-time career.

== Background ==
According to Runnells, after attending a fireside by Marlin K. Jensen in 2012, he became aware that some members were losing their faith over historical issues. After investigation, Runnells learned about and was disturbed by Joseph Smith's marriages to already-married women and criticism of the Book of Abraham. "I began to have these feelings of betrayal. I wasn't the village idiot. I read books—a lot of the approved books. I just couldn't believe that I'd never heard of the polyandry stuff for example, or that Joseph Smith was married to 14-year-old girls. It just really shocked me."

Runnells' grandfather put him in contact with a CES institute director who suggested he write a letter with a list of his concerns. In March 2013, Runnells posted a rough draft of his letter on Reddit asking for feedback. In April, he shared the revised version he had sent to the CES director. The letter was well-received on Reddit, with many saying they wanted to show it to friends and family.

== Content ==
The CES Letter outlined the list of issues Runnells has with LDS Church beliefs and its historical narrative. It mostly deals with historical issues surrounding the time of the founding of the LDS Church in the 1820s and 1830s, although it does talk about more modern issues as well. This list includes issues surrounding:

- Golden Plates. Runnels notes the golden plates were not actually used in the translation of the Book of Mormon -- instead Smith used a stone in a hat. Runnels notes that the self-described witnesses to the plates were believers in second sight, divination rods, and magical treasure scrying.
- Book of Mormon. Runnels notes the text contains errors unique to the 1769 edition of the King James Bible and relays a ahistorical narrative contradicted by archaeological and DNA evidence. Runnels notes the existence of multiple hominid species and the presence of Neanderthal DNA in modern humans. He reports biblical stories like a global flood, Noah's Ark, and the Tower of Babel are modernly considered mythical.
- Book of Abraham. Runnells points out the reported translation was taken from Egyptian papyri that were later revealed to be a common funerary text with no connection to the biblical patriarch.
- Mormonism and Freemasonry. Runnels notes that supposedly-ancient Mormon Temple rites like secret handshakes are actually derived from 19th-century Freemasonry.
- Restoration of the Priesthood. Runnels argues the story of Cowdery and Smith meeting John the Baptist and other biblical figures was unknown until years after its supposed occurrence. He argues Smith and Cowdery changed the wording of an earlier revelation, adding mention of the meeting and thereby effectively backdating the story.
- Smith's 'First Vision'. Runnels similarly argues the story of Smith seeing God the Father and Jesus in childhood was unknown to Smith's associates until 12 to 22 years after its supposed occurrence, suggesting it was a later invention.
- Polygamy and polyandry. Runnels objects to Smith's marriages to other men's wives and his marriages to teenagers including a 14-year-old girl. He criticizes the church for its false denials of the practice.
- Asserted prophetic abilities. Runnells argues Smith and other prophets were duped by a set of supposedly-ancient plates that were later revealed to be a 19th-century hoax, despite Smith having translated them. Runnells similarly questions 20th-century church prophets for their defense of the works of Mark Hofman -- works later revealed to be hoaxed. Runnells covers refuted or outdated doctrines taught by past prophets, including Adam–God doctrine, blood atonement, and the ban on black people in the Mormon temples or leadership.
- Church finances. Runnels objects that the church no longer provides transparent financial disclosures. Of the City Creek Center project, Runnels writes: "something is fundamentally wrong with 'the one true Church' spending more on an estimated $1.5 billion dollar high-end megamall than it has in 26 years of humanitarian aid." Runnels critiques church emphasis on paying tithing "even if paying tithing means that you don’t have enough money to feed your family".
- "Anti-intellectualism". Runnells argues the church takes disciplinary actions against scholars who publish research contradicting church doctrine, citing the September Six.

A main theme of the letter is the belief of Runnells that the LDS Church knew unflattering aspects about its history but deliberately hid or misrepresented them.

The CES Letter does not contain any new research. Runnells describes it as a condensation or distillation of preexisting research, particularly that of Jerald and Sandra Tanner.

== Response ==
No official response from the LDS Church was released, including from the CES director to whom Runnells sent his letter. Runnells said of him, "I honestly don't blame him for not responding back to me. He was probably expecting five questions in an e-mail and I throw him close to a 77–80 page document." Tad R. Callister, then general president of the church's Sunday School, referring to Runnells as an unnamed "critic", wrote that the assertions from Runnells were "rash", "partial truths", and "a classic case of 'presentism'".

Numerous responses by LDS Church apologists in blogs, books, and podcasts have been made, including several by FairMormon. Brian Hales of FairMormon suggested that Runnells was lying, and had been deceived by Satan. Runnells posted an extensive rebuttal to FairMormon's response.

=== FairMormon ===
In November 2020, FairMormon released a set of 16 videos responding to Runnells, that was designed to appeal to Millennials and Generation Z. Latter Day Saint scholar Grant Hardy said of the videos

"I have found them belligerent, sarcastic, sophomoric, inaccurate, demeaning, and offensive, ... In no way [do they] reflect Christian discipleship."

In response to criticism that the videos were mocking Runnells and other disaffected Latter-day Saints, FairMormon chairman John Lynch said, "We are not trying to mock the people who are affected by the 'CES Letter,' ... We are mocking the letter itself and signal to people that this is a deceitful document, not to be taken seriously." Runnells responded to the videos in a Facebook post, reposting a video calling them a "dishonest smear campaign".

In March 2021, FairMormon changed its name to FAIR, and removed the YouTube videos directed at Runnells and the CES Letter. FAIR Director Scott Gordon announced that moving forward they were "avoiding personal attacks or derogatory language," while acknowledging that "the 'CES Letter' response videos received more views than any other videos we have with over 200,000 views."

=== Disciplinary council ===
In 2016, as a result of the letter's content and public criticisms of the church, Runnells' local LDS Church leaders conducted a disciplinary council to determine the membership status of Runnells. Towards the end of the council, before a determination had been made, Runnells resigned his membership, exited the church building where the council was being held, and stated to a crowd of supporters outside the church:

I have excommunicated the LDS Church ... from my life. ... What errors or mistakes are there in the "CES Letter" or on my website that I can publicly correct? If there are no errors or mistakes, why am I being punished for seeking and sharing the truth? I have done nothing wrong. I just wanted the truth.

Utah news station KUTV pointed to a survey that 57% of LDS Church members were troubled by high-profile excommunications like Runnells, including 43% of temple recommend holders.

== Aftermath ==
The CES Letter, along with a book published by Egyptologist Robert K. Ritner and the reactions generated by apologists were influential in the 2014 release by the LDS Church of an essay addressing historical inaccuracies in the Book of Abraham.

A Spider-Man comic book was published in 2018 that had a patch drawn on the protagonist that read, "CES Letter". Upon being notified Marvel released a statement saying,

"As a policy, Marvel does not permit hidden controversial messages in its artwork"

and scrubbed the reference from further artwork. The artist, Ryan Ottley, also released a statement saying,

"My entire family are members, as are many of my friends, and I would never include anything mean-spirited about them or their beliefs. The reference was in regards to a subject I am interested in and a personal decision I made in my life. It has nothing to do with the character, the story, or Marvel."

In 2018, when Lars Nielsen published confidential documents about the investment fund of the LDS Church, he titled his work, "Letter to an IRS Director" in homage to the "Letter to a CES Director" written by Runnells. Nielsen said,

"I wrote 'Letter to an IRS Director' in the style (and in admiration) of 'Letter to a CES Director' because isolated, questioning Mormons need hours of immersive, binge-worthy, relatable, and rich content when their 'shelves begins to break'."

=== Catalyst for members leaving the LDS Church ===
According to the Salt Lake Tribune and The Daily Beast, the letter has been influential in the decision of many now-former members of the LDS Church to resign their membership.

Writer Jana Riess has argued that the impact of the CES Letter has been overstated, yet still important. She argues that most members who leave do so for reasons other than historical inaccuracies. Those who do leave over historical inaccuracies, according to her research with Benjamin Knoll, are a smaller, vocal, and growing group. This is inconsistent with a non-random, unscientific survey conducted by podcaster John Dehlin indicating that, among self-recruited survey respondents, historical reasons were a factor in 70% of former members' decisions to leave.
