= Simon Southerton =

Australian botanist

Simon G. Southerton is an Australian plant geneticist and co-founder of Gondwana Genomics, an Australian technology firm specialising in Marker-assisted selection for tree breeding. Southerton published the book Losing a Lost Tribe: Native Americans, DNA, and the Mormon Church. The book uses genetic evidence to examine the historical accuracy of the Book of Mormon and related claims about the Lamanite people.

Southerton was a member of the Church of Jesus Christ of Latter-day Saints (LDS Church), having converted to the church at age 10; as an adult, he was a Mormon missionary in Melbourne and a bishop in Australia. Because of his inability to reconcile church teachings with science, Southerton resigned as a bishop in 1998 and left the church. However, after Southerton's book was published, the church formally charged him with apostasy.

In an email sent to the Associated Press following his excommunication from the LDS Church, Southerton stated he was excommunicated for being too vocal regarding the results of the Genomics Project DNA. However, those who attended Southerton's church disciplinary council contended that the excommunication had nothing to do with the book. In an interview with Mormon podcast host John Dehlin, Southerton explained that he was prevented from talking about his position regarding the DNA evidence in connection with the Book of Mormon and clarified that the excommunication was not for adultery, but rather for "inappropriate relations with a woman" during a period of time he was separated from his wife in 2003. He also felt that the 2005 disciplinary action was taken after he had already been inactive in the church for seven years and maintains that the disciplinary actions were a direct result of the publishing of his book but done in such a way to prevent further spread of his position regarding genetics and the Book of Mormon.

In 2014, Southerton co-founded Gondwana Genomics with DNA marker technology licensed from the CSIRO. In early 2018, Gondwana Genomics became the first to deploy marker-assisted selection on a commercial scale in tree breeding, screening over 11,000 trees and seedlings for Eucalyptus breeding programs.

== See also ==
- Criticism of Mormonism
- Thomas W. Murphy (anthropologist)
