= Church membership council =

Form of discipline in the LDS church

In the Church of Jesus Christ of Latter-day Saints (LDS Church), a church membership council (formerly called a disciplinary council) is an ecclesiastical event during which a church member's status is considered, typically for alleged violations of church standards. If a church member is found to have committed an offense by a membership council, they may have their name removed from church records, or their church membership may be otherwise restricted. Church membership councils are at times referred to unofficially as church courts.

== Purposes ==
According to the church's General Handbook, the purposes of church membership councils are to:

1. Help protect others;
2. Help a person access the redeeming power of Jesus Christ through repentance; and
3. Protect the integrity of the church.

== Structure and procedures ==
=== Ward church membership council ===
A church membership council may be convened by the bishop of a local ward (congregation). In such an instance, the council is composed of the bishop and his two counselors. The ward clerk will also be present to take notes of the proceedings. Attendance of the ward Relief Society president (for women) or elders quorum president (for men) is optional. After hearing all of the evidence in the case, the bishop and his counselors are encouraged to make a joint, unanimous decision on the outcome. However, the bishop has the final say and can theoretically make a decision over the protest of either or both of his counselors.

=== Stake church membership council ===
A stake church membership council is convened by the stake president in instances where it appears that a member who has received their temple endowment has committed an offense which may result in withdrawal of membership, or when the subject is a member of a bishop's immediate family. In such instances, the council is composed of the stake president and his two counselors. Attendance of the member's bishop, Relief Society president (for women), or elders quorum president (for men) is optional. The twelve members of the stake high council also participate when there are contested facts, they would add value and balance, the member requests their participation, or a member of the stake presidency or his family is involved. After hearing the evidence in the case and the submissions of the high councilors (if any)—one half of whom speak on behalf of the accused—the stake president and his counselors are encouraged to make a joint, unanimous decision on the outcome. However, the stake president has the final say and can theoretically make a decision over the protest of either or both of his counselors.

=== Mission membership council ===
A mission president can convene a church membership council for a full-time missionary within his mission or a member within a district of his mission. He can also authorize branch or district presidents in a district to convene church membership councils.

=== Common Council of the Church ===
If the need arises to convene a church membership council for the church's president or one of his counselors in the First Presidency, the Common Council of the Church must be convened by the church's presiding bishop. The Common Council is made up of the presiding bishop and his counselors and twelve other high priests selected by the presiding bishop. The Common Council has only been convened twice: In August 1838, after the return of Zion's Camp, the Council formally convened for the first time to consider charges made by Sylvester Smith against Joseph Smith, who was eventually cleared. In September 1844, Presiding Bishop Newel K. Whitney convened a Common Council which excommunicated Sidney Rigdon, who was the senior surviving member of the First Presidency after the death of Joseph Smith.

=== Evidence ===
The council begins by the presiding officer stating the reported misconduct and asking the accused person to admit or deny it. If the person denies the misconduct, the presiding officer or a designee presents the evidence of the misconduct. Evidence may be presented in the form of written or oral statements by witnesses or other documents. An accused person's previous confession cannot be used as evidence in a disciplinary council without the member's consent. The accused member is given a chance to question the witnesses against them. After the evidence against the accused is presented, the accused is permitted to present evidence in response. The accused can comment on the evidence and make any other statement they want to make. All witnesses and the accused may also be questioned by any member of the disciplinary council. No witness is placed under oath. Since the disciplinary council is an ecclesiastical court, rules of evidence that govern domestic courts do not apply.

If the accused person admits to the conduct in question, no evidence is presented before the council.

=== Decision ===
Once a decision has been reached by the church membership council, the decision is announced to the accused person and the presiding officer explains the conditions that are imposed by the decision. The accused is also informed of his or her right to appeal the decision. Other members of the church may be notified of the decision in certain circumstances.

=== Appeal ===
An accused member may appeal the decision of the church membership council within 30 days of the decision being made. Appeals of a ward membership council are made to the stake church membership council (i.e. the stake president and his two counselors). An appeal of the decision of a stake or mission church membership council is to the church's First Presidency. An appeal of a decision of a church membership council convened by a branch president or a district president in a mission is to the mission president. The body hearing the appeal may vary the decision of the council in any way or let the original decision stand.

=== Records ===
The proceedings of the church membership council are submitted electronically to the office of the First Presidency where the information it contains is permanently stored. It is also reviewed by the body hearing the appeal if an appeal is made.

Stake presidents are permitted to request records of past councils for members of their stake from the office of the First Presidency. Bishops may request records of past councils for members of their ward.

In the case of withdrawal of membership, the person is removed from church records.

== Qualifying offences ==
=== When a church membership council is mandatory ===
The LDS Church has instructed leaders that a church membership council is mandatory when evidence suggests that a member of the church may have committed any of the following offences against the standards of the church: Murder; rape; sexual assault conviction; child or youth abuse; abuse of a spouse or another adult; predatory behavior (violent, sexual, or financial); incest; child pornography; plural marriage; serious sin while holding a prominent church position; and most felony convictions.

=== When a church membership council may be appropriate ===
The LDS Church has instructed leaders that a church membership council may be appropriate when evidence suggests that a member may have committed any of the following offenses against the standards of the church (whether or not a disciplinary council will be held will depend on the facts of the situation and is generally left to the discretion of the bishop or stake president): attempted murder; sexual abuse, including assault and harassment; abuse of a spouse or another adult; adultery, fornication, or same-sex relations; cohabitation, civil unions and partnerships, or same-sex marriage; intensive or compulsive use of pornography that has caused significant harm to a member's marriage or family; robbery, burglary, theft, or embezzlement; perjury; serious sin while holding a position of authority or trust in the church or the community; serious sin that is widely known; abortion; pattern of serious sins; deliberate abandonment of family responsibilities, including nonpayment of child support and alimony; sale of illegal drugs; other serious criminal acts; apostasy; and embezzlement of church funds.

=== When a membership council is not appropriate ===
The LDS Church has instructed leaders that church membership councils are not appropriately held to resolve or deal with the following circumstances: inactivity in the church; not fulfilling church duties; not paying tithing; sins of omission; masturbation; not complying with the Word of Wisdom; using pornography, except for child pornography or intensive or compulsive use of pornography that has caused significant harm to a member's marriage or family; business failures or nonpayment of debts; and civil disputes.

== Possible outcomes ==
A disciplinary council may reach one of four possible outcomes:

1. Remain in good standing. This is the result when the church membership council determines that no offense has taken place. However, even if it is determined that an offense did occur, the council may impose no formal action and instead give "cautionary counsel" or recommend consultation with the member's bishop for caution or counsel.
2. Personal counseling with the bishop or stake president and informal membership restriction (formerly known as "informal probation"). This action temporarily restricts or suspends a member's privileges of church membership in the way specified by the council. Possible actions could include suspending the right to partake of the sacrament, hold a church calling, exercise the priesthood, or enter the temple.
3. Formal membership restrictions (formerly known as "disfellowshipment"). A person who has formal membership restrictions is still a member of the Church but is no longer in good standing. A person with a formal membership restriction may not hold a temple recommend, serve in a church calling, or exercise the priesthood. Members under these restrictions may attend public meetings of the church, but may not give a sermon, teach a lesson, offer a public prayer, partake of the sacrament, or vote in sustaining church officers. However, such members may pay tithing and fast offerings and continue to wear the temple garment. If the member expresses repentance and abides by the conditions imposed upon them, formal membership restrictions usually last approximately one year. Only a reconvened church membership council can remove the condition of membership restriction. Formal membership restriction is considered a relatively severe action which is adequate for most serious transgressions.
4. Withdrawal of membership (formerly known as "excommunication"). An individual whose membership is withdrawn is no longer a member of the LDS Church. All of the restrictions of a formal membership restriction also apply to individuals who have their membership withdrawn. In addition, such a person is not permitted to pay tithing or fast offerings or wear the temple garment. Withdrawal of membership is the most serious sanction a church membership council can impose and is generally reserved for only the most severe offenses. Withdrawal of church membership is mandatory for murder and is almost always required for incest. Withdrawal of membership may also be appropriate for members who have had formal membership restrictions placed upon them and have not repented. Withdrawal of membership almost always lasts at least one year; only a reconvened membership council may approve a person's readmittance to the church through baptism.

== See also ==
- Ahkam
- Church discipline - related practices of other denominations

- Jehovah's Witnesses congregational discipline

- Communicative action
- Deviance (sociology)
- Ex-Mormon
- Excommunication § The Church of Jesus Christ of Latter-day Saints
- Group cohesiveness
- Herem (censure)
- List of former Latter Day Saints
- Ostracism
- Restorative justice
- Right hand of Christian fellowship - compare with disfellowshipment
- Shunning
- Social alienation
- Social engagement
- Social exclusion
- Social rejection
- Social stigma
- Stigma management
- Taboo
