= Lynn Wilder =

American Christian author and professor

Lynn K. Wilder (born 1952) is a Christian author and former Brigham Young University (BYU) professor. She became well known for discussing how she left the Church of Jesus Christ of Latter-day Saints (LDS Church) in the 2011 video-documentary Unveiling Grace.

== Biography ==
Wilder attended high school in Richmond, Indiana. She married her husband Michael in 1974. The couple have three sons, Joshua, Matt and Micah, and a daughter, Katie. They joined the LDS Church in 1977, after Mormon missionaries knocked on their door and converted them.

Wilder earned a PhD at Ball State University in Muncie, Indiana. She became a professor of Counseling Psychology and Special Education at BYU in 1999.

In 2006, she converted and became an evangelical Born-Again Christian after her son, Micah, who was serving a Mormon mission to Orlando, Florida, told his parents that he was having doubts about the LDS Church and after studying the New Testament. Two years after her conversion, she resigned from BYU.

Jana Riess characterizes Wilder's signature book, Unveiling Grace, as "more even-handed" than the provocative marketing campaign would suggest, differing from what Riess characterizes as the typical tell-all, ex-Mormon memoir in that it shows Wilder's love for Mormons as people, even as she rejects LDS theology.

== Bibliography ==
- Unveiling Grace: The Story of How We Found Our Way Out of the Mormon Church (2013)

== Filmography ==
Film
Year	Film	Role	Notes
2011	Unveiling Grace	Herself	Short film
2015	The Mormons: Who They Are, What They Believe	Herself	Documentary
