= Mr. Deity =

- (Left to Right) Jesus, Lucy, the Deity, and Larry
- Genre: Comedy
- Created by: Brian Keith Dalton
- Directed by: Brian Keith Dalton
- Starring: Brian Keith Dalton; Jimbo Marshall; Sean Douglas; Amy Rohren
- Opening theme: The Mr. Deity Theme
- Composer: Brian Keith Dalton
- Country of origin: United States
- Original language: English
- No. of seasons: 7

Production
- Producers: Brian Keith Dalton; Jimbo Marshall; Sean Douglas
- Running time: 2 to 7 minutes

Original release
- Network: YouTube; Crackle
- Release: December 27, 2006 – present

Mr. Deity is a series of satirical short films that parody aspects of religion, created by Brian Keith Dalton and distributed by Lazy Eye Pictures. It stars Brian Keith Dalton, Jimbo Marshall, Sean Douglas, and Amy Rohren. It premiered on December 27, 2006. The show was hosted on YouTube, after a spell on Crackle and is currently available on the Mr. Deity channel on YouTube. In early 2012 Jimbo Marshall ended his participation to work in his own production company, "Your Video Solution."

== History ==
After the 2004 tsunami hit Sri Lanka, director Brian Keith Dalton was amazed that his then brother-in-law, a Sri Lankan, could still find "God's hand" in the disaster after so many people lost their lives suddenly. This prompted him to write about it, at first for his own amusement, and becoming the inspiration for the show. In late 2006 Dalton decided to make a series of short comedy films about God surveying the universe with his assistant. The first episode, called "Mr. Deity and the Evil," features only Dalton and his friend, cinematographer Jimbo Marshall, making decisions about what evils to allow. Jesus appears in the second episode, played by Sean Douglas. Amy Rohren rounded out the cast, portraying Lucifer (or Lucy) later in the first season.

After the last episode of the first season, Dalton signed a deal with Sony Pictures Entertainment to create a TV version of Mr. Deity for HBO. The deal also made the second season of the web series exclusive to Sony's comedy website, Crackle.com. The Sony deal eventually fell through, prompting Dalton to bring the series back to YouTube. In May 2009 a trailer parodying Frost/Nixon using the cast of Mr. Deity was released, inaugurating the third season of the show.

During an interview in 2023, Brian Keith Dalton said the sixth season would be the final of the series.

== Theological views ==
Mr. Deity often expresses annoyance with organized religion or human beings who claim to speak in his name, although he often treats this as an issue of improper attribution rather than a theological problem. In "Mr. Deity and the Book" and "Mr. Deity and the Book, Part Deux", he becomes very irate over being attributed as the author of the Bible, due to not being included in the editorial process.

Mormons are specifically named in "Mr. Deity and the Book" as being a source of irritation to Mr. Deity due to their scriptural canonization of the idea that certain non-African humans with dark skin were cursed by God to lose their whiteness due to wicked behavior. Notably, Dalton is himself a former Mormon or Formon, a term he coined in 1996.

== Cast ==
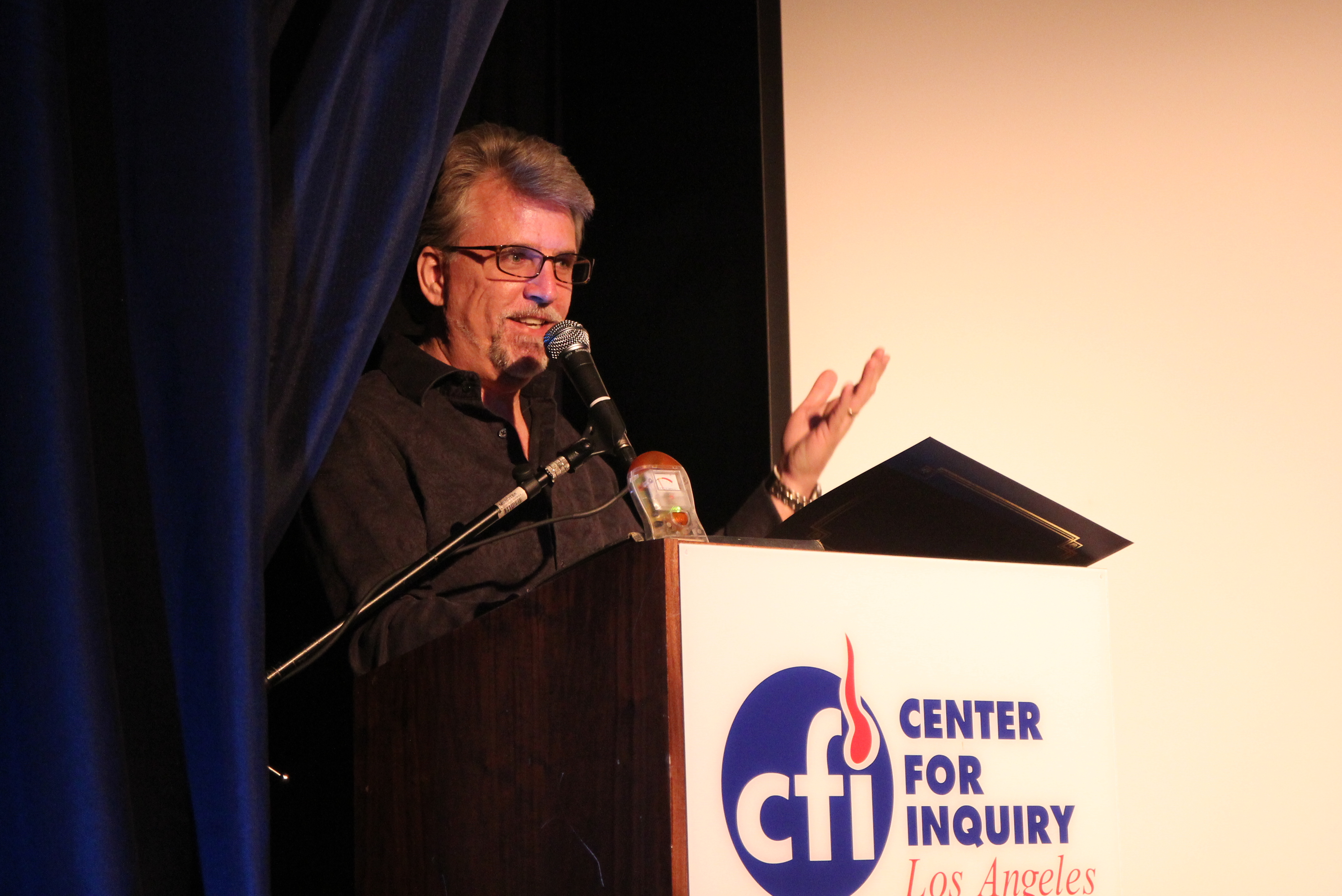
Brian Dalton accepts award from the IIG August 21, 2010

- Brian Keith Dalton: Mr. Deity, a.k.a. El, "El? Oh, him." The creator. Has little interest in—or even full comprehension of—the lives of humans and admits creating humans "to pass the time, provide some entertainment." He proclaims he's not a "details guy," adding that "Lucy handles that" and generally takes the credit for Larry's ideas as well as delegating most tasks to him. He is in an on-again–off-again relationship with Lucy. His misunderstandings of humans, general confusion, self-absorption and pop-culture references are generally the basis of episodes.
- Jimbo Marshall: Larry, Mr. Deity's assistant. He often helps the Deity stay on task and reviews important details in the plan, clarifying his work, and recording that which is noteworthy; for instance, in putting together the Top Ten list. Despite popular thinking, he is not a version of the Holy Spirit.
- Sean Douglas: Jesus, Does Mr. Deity a "really big favor" by going to Earth, leading a sinless life, then being sacrificed in the original version of the script. In return he is made "full partner, 1/3 vote". However his own views are often at odds with the Deity's plan, either out of general confusion, misunderstanding, or moral objection. He contributed to the Top Ten list, tries to make sense out of the Deity's edicts, and attempts to get out of being crucified. In the first season Mr. Deity often forgets his name and has called him Jesse. Jesus also occasionally calls Mr. Deity "Dad." Notably, neither the Deity nor Jesus have a full grasp of the Trinity.
- Amy Rohren: Lucifer or "Lucy", was dumped by Mr. Deity prior to the show and was then appointed by him to run hell. At one point she hired Nietzsche to kill him in retaliation for dumping her. When introduced she requested to have her mascot changed to a "bunny" instead of a snake, and they compromised on a goat. She and Mr. Deity have an on–off relationship. He uses her to facilitate his plan and inflict suffering on others for his amusement.
- Jarrett Lennon Kaufman: Timmy, technical adviser to Mr. Deity.

== Awards and recognition ==
On August 21, 2010, Dalton was honored with an award recognizing his contributions with Mr. Deity in the skeptical field, from The IIG during its 10th Anniversary Gala.

== Episodes ==
=== Season 1 ===
Title	Topic	Original airdate	#
Mr. Deity and the Evil	After Mr. Deity creates the universe, Larry finds out what kinds of evil he'll allow.	December 27, 2006	1
Mr. Deity and the Really Big Favor	Mr. Deity seeks help to save mankind while Larry oversees construction efforts.	December 29, 2006	2
Mr. Deity and the Light	Mr. Deity and Larry have trouble with the lighting on their new world.	January 3, 2007	3
Mr. Deity and the Messages	Mr. Deity explains prayer to Jesus while Larry gathers info on the evening's activities.	January 14, 2007	4
Mr. Deity and Lucifer	Larry unforgivably forwards a call from Lucifer (or Lucy) to Mr. Deity's personal phone. All Hell breaks loose.	January 29, 2007	5
Mr. Deity Super Bowl Extra: The Press Conference	Mr. Deity holds a press conference on the eve of the Super Bowl in order to clear things up.	February 2, 2007	6
Mr. Deity and the Tour de Hell	Lucy takes Mr. Deity on a tour of Hell.	February 20, 2007	7
Mr. Deity and the Top Ten	Jesus, Larry, and Mr. Deity struggle to come up with a Top Ten list.	March 7, 2007	8
Mr. Deity and the Book	Mr. Deity is outraged by a billboard which presumes his authorship of a certain book.	March 26, 2007	9
Mr. Deity and the Seed	Mr. Deity and Lucy work through a problem while Larry copes with the on-again/off-again nature of their relationship.	April 15, 2007	10

=== Season 2 ===
Title	Topic	Original airdate	#
Mr. Deity and the Intel	Mr. Deity, Lucy, and George W. Bush discuss the finer points on the War On Terror.	October 17, 2007	11
Mr. Deity and the Meaning Game	Mr. Deity and Larry discuss the meaning and purpose of life.	November 3, 2007	12
Mr. Deity and the Voicemail	A harmless prank phone call to Jesus gets Mr. Deity into a huge PR mess.	November 17, 2007	13
Mr. Deity and the Notes	Jesus has a few script notes for Mr. Deity.	November 30, 2007	14
Mr. Deity and the Really Cheap Meal	The group goes out for a heavenly night on the town.	December 14, 2007	15
Mr. Deity and the Murder	Mr. Deity and Lucy play a little game with Cain and Abel.	January 9, 2008	16
Mr. Deity and the Limbo	Mr. Deity gets rid of Limbo, the First Circle of Hell...not the game, and Lucy gets pissed.	January 23, 2008	17
Mr. Deity and the Good	Mr. Deity and Larry discuss the finer points of religious fundamentalism and idealism.	February 8, 2008	18
Mr. Deity and the Help Meet	Gender roles determined by Mr. Deity and Lucy.	February 22, 2008	19
Mr. Deity and the Dress Rehearsal	Mr. Deity experiences difficulty relaying his vision.	March 7, 2008	20

=== Season 3 ===
Title	Topic	Original airdate	#
Mr. Deity and the Virgin	Larry is stunned by Mr. Deity's callous response to a grave crisis.	June 8, 2009	21
Mr. Deity and the Book, Part Deux	Mr. Deity is outraged with the ideologies associated with him by the Christians in the Bible. He and Larry conceive various ways to punish them.	June 23, 2009	22
Mr. Deity and the Magic	Lucy explains to Mr. Deity the difference between magic and magic tricks. They then argue over the virtue of knowledge.	July 6, 2009	23
Mr. Deity and the Scripts	Jesus wants Mr. Deity to pare down the four scripts into one coherent narrative that he can act.	August 3, 2009	24
Mr. Deity and the Really Unique Gift	Lucy finds out what Mr. Deity is giving his chosen people.	August 10, 2009	25
Mr. Deity and the Planes	Larry tries to get Mr. Deity to do something about the upcoming attack on New York City.	September 3, 2009	26
Mr. Deity and the Skeptic	Skeptic Michael Shermer pleads his case before Jesus and Mr. Deity.	September 15, 2009	27
Mr. Deity and Da Man	Mr. Deity and Larry prepare Adam for a wife.	September 28, 2009	28
Mr. Deity and the Science Advisor	Mr. Deity is told by his science advisor PZ Myers that his design for the humans leaves something to be desired.	October 12, 2009	29
Mr. Deity and the Identity Crisis	Mr. Deity and Jesus try to figure out their relationship.	October 27, 2009	30
Mr. Deity and Death	Mr. Deity has to deal with an angry Death, whose day goes from bad to worse.	November 10, 2009	31
Mr. Deity and the Woman	Mr. Deity and Larry wake the Created Eve for her first look at the Garden.	November 23, 2009	32
Mr. Deity and the Wrong Number	Attempting to show Larry his new "Speed Dial" app, Mr. Deity gets a wrong number.	December 16, 2009	33
Mr. Deity and the Magic, Part Deux	Mr. Deity thinks he's finally proved the existence of other magical beings.	December 23, 2009	34
Mr. Deity and the Hard Wire	The head of R&D explains the limitations of the human brain to Mr. Deity and Lucy.	January 11, 2010	35
Mr. Deity and the Promised Land	Mr. Deity is questioned by Larry about his plans for the Promised Land.	January 24, 2010	36
Mr. Deity and the Really Hard Time	Mr. Deity needs to find time to create time.	February 8, 2010	37
Mr. Deity and the Baptist	Mr. Deity and Larry in conversation with the head of John the Baptist.	February 22, 2010	38
Mr. Deity and the Host	Jesus is eaten alive.	March 9, 2010	39
Mr. Deity and the Equations	Mr. Deity frantically throws together his own version of science in an attempt to save his job.	March 23, 2010	40
Mr. Deity and the Quitter	Jesus walks out on God's plan.	April 12, 2010	41

=== Season 4 (prequel) ===
Title	Topic	Original airdate	#
Mr. Deity and the Void	It is explained how Mr. Deity, or El, came into existence.	June 28, 2010	42
Mr. Deity and Larry	After leaving the void, Mr. Deity is welcomed to the Omniverse by Larry.	July 18, 2010	43
Mr. Deity and the Psych Exam	Mr. Deity submits to a psych exam.	August 2, 2010	44
Mr. Deity and the Denial	Mr. Deity's request to become a creator god is denied, so he plans to go rogue.	August 23, 2010	45
Mr. Deity on the Lamb	Mr. Deity needs a co-creator, and he thinks Jesus is the Son of Man for the job.	September 15, 2010	46
Mr. Deity and the Casting Call	Mr. Deity looks for someone to play the role of Savior in his new universe.	November 1, 2010	47
Mr. Deity and the Goodie Two-Shoes	Mr. Deity and Larry discuss the variable parameters of Free Will.	November 21, 2010	48
Mr. Deity and the Barbecue	Mr. Deity's plans for a region of reprimand are discovered by John.	December 14, 2010	49
Mr. Deity and the Matter	Timmy tries to avoid telling Mr. Deity that they don't have enough matter to create a universe organically.	January 24, 2011	50
Mr. Deity and the Showroom	Timmy introduces Mr. Deity to Dark Matter.	February 15, 2011	51
Mr. Deity and the Signs	Mr. Deity is concerned that Larry has rigged the Universe in order to give people signs of His existence.	March 8, 2011	52
Mr. Deity and the After Party	Mr. Deity and John go over the plans for the after party.	March 28, 2011	53
Mr. Deity and the Ghost Thing	Mr. Deity and Jesus brainstorm about their trio.	April 18, 2011	54
Mr. Deity and the Magician	Mr. Deity seeks the help of a magician (Jamy Ian Swiss) in order to launch his six-day creation model.	May 9, 2011	55
Mr. Deity and the Days	Mr. Deity chats with Larry, Timmy, and John about the six days of Creation.	June 13, 2011	56
Mr. Deity and the Opposition	Mr. Deity talks to Larry about Lucy becoming his "antagonist."	July 12, 2011	57
Mr. Deity and the Believing Brain	Mr. Deity seeks help from Michael Shermer to make his creatures more gullible.	August 3, 2011	58
Mr. Deity and the Philosopher	Mr. Deity is questioned by Christopher DiCarlo about what makes something "right."	August 25, 2011	59
Mr. Deity and the Naughty Bits	The Deity crew finally find an intelligent life form to populate their universe.	October 17, 2011	60
Mr. Deity and the Bang	Mr. Deity and his group finally set off the Big Bang.	November 22, 2011	61

=== Season 5 ===
Title	Topic	Original airdate	#
Mr. Deity and the Quitter, Part Deux	Having quit the Deity project, Jesse/Jesus roams the ancient world, sharing Mr. Deity's script with the Egyptians, Greeks, and Romans.	Jan 24, 2012	62
Mr. Deity and the Occupation	Mr. Deity is confronted by the Occupy Heaven Movement.	Feb 14, 2012	63
Mr. Deity and The Artist	In the style of the film The Artist, Mr. Deity goes into his silent period.	Mar 5, 2012	64
Mr. Deity and the Therapist	Mr. Deity and Lucy visit a therapist to discuss the problem of evil and suffering.	Apr 4, 2012	65
Mr. Deity and the Latter-Days	Mr. Deity, Lucy, and John the Baptist meet with Joseph Smith to hear about his exciting new ideas for the latter-days.	May 1, 2012	66
Mr. Deity and the Rights	Mr. Deity shares his plan for human rights with Lucy.	May 24, 2012	67
Mr. Deity and the Hitch	A tribute of sorts to the late Christopher Hitchens	Jul 10, 2012	68
Mr. Deity and the Marriage	Mr. Deity deals with the thorny issue of marriage	Aug 9, 2012	69
Mr. Deity and the Signs (Part Deux)	Mr. Deity and Jesus discuss signs big and small	Sep 24, 2012	70
Mr. Deity and the New Testament	Lucy is thrilled by the teachings of the New Testament	Oct 29, 2012	71
Mr. Deity and Another Testament	John (the Baptist) tries to dissuade Mr. Deity from releasing another testament "as is."	Nov 20, 2012	72
Mr. Deity and the Old Testament	Larry has some bad news regarding the Old Testament	Nov 30, 2012	73

=== Season 6 ===
Title	Topic	Original airdate	#
Mr. Deity and the Crash	Mr. Deity wakes to find his finances taking a dive.	Dec 6, 2012	74
Mr. Deity Superbowl [sic] Extravaganza 2013	Mr. Deity asks Lucy to help him pick a team to win the Super Bowl.	Feb 3, 2013	75
Mr. Deity and the Advocate	Mr. Deity interrupts a strategy session between Lucy and David Silverman.	Feb 27, 2013	76
Mr. Deity and the Chaplain	Mr. Deity sits down with Lucy and her chaplain. With Richard Milner as Charles Darwin.	Mar 25, 2013	77
Mr. Deity and the Flood	Mr. Deity discusses the flood with a geologist. With Donald Prothero.	Jun 17, 2013	78
Mr. Deity and the Myth	Mr. Deity turns Jesus into a mythical character so he can avoid the cross.	Jul 17, 2013	79
Mr. Deity and the Hat	Joseph Smith teaches Mr. Deity how to translate ancient languages. With Michael McAdam.	Aug 14, 2013	80
Mr. Deity and the Hand	Mr. Deity explains why he's removing his hand of protection from the land.	Oct 19, 2013	81
Mr. Deity and the War	Jesus and Mr. Deity prepare for war.	Dec 13, 2013	82
Mr. Deity and the Killing	Lucy forces Mr. Deity to reveal His plan to kill a celebrity who has angered Him.	Apr 14, 2014	83
Mr. Deity and the Help	Lucy talks with Mr. Deity about all the help he's been giving people in the wealthier countries of the world.	Sep 29, 2014	84
Mr. Deity and the Atheist	Richard Dawkins is mistakenly brought to the realm of the Deity.	Feb 24, 2015	85
Mr. Deity and the Secret	Mr. Deity and Lucy discuss the scrip for the Mormon Temple ceremony.	May 31, 2015	86
Mr. Deity and the Donations	Mr. Deity asks Lucy's assistant about some suspicious donations.	Jun 29, 2015	87
Mr. Deity and the Sting	Mr. Deity commissions a former pastor to infiltrate big Atheism.	Aug 16, 2015	88
Mr. Deity and the Evidence	Mr. Deity has found evidence of The Exodus.	Sep 28, 2015	89
Mr. Deity and the Knowing	Mr. Deity turns his all-knowingness back on.	Nov 23, 2015	90
Mr. Deity and the Apologist	Mr. Deity is excited about one of Allah's new apologists.	Jan 31, 2016	91
Mr. Deity and the Call	Mr. Deity finds out that Jesus has been moonlighting.	May 8, 2016	92
Mr. Deity and the Root	Mr. Deity gets some news from his financial advisor.	Jun 1, 2016	93
Mr. Deity and the Job	Mr. Deity thinks he's made a bet with Lucy regarding Job.	Aug 15, 2016	94
Mr. Deity and the Ban	An early episode of Mr. Deity from 1977.	Nov 22, 2016	95
Mr. Deity and the Book, Part Trois	Lucy confronts Mr. Deity about his promise to replace and repeal his original book.	Apr 27, 2017	96
Mr. Deity and the Stuntman	Mr. Deity talks to a stuntman about filling in for a while.	Sep 5, 2017	97
Mr. Deity and the Crises	As crises mount, Lucy worries that Mr. Deity is not on top of things.	Nov 20, 2017	98
Mr. Deity and the Role Model	Lucy is bothered by the story of King David.	Apr 29, 2018	99
Mr. Deity and the U	Mr. Deity confesses that he's been pursuing higher education.	Jul 10, 2018	100
Mr. Deity and the Mormons	Mr. Deity learns that Mormons are seeking a new name.	Oct 30, 2018	101
Mr. Deity and the Press Conference	Mr. Deity holds a press conference to talk about his political preferences.	May 1, 2019	102
Mr. Deity and the #MeToo	Mr. Deity confronts the MeToo era and a new member of his crew.	Jan. 28, 2020 (Note: Episode was re-released on Feb. 19, 2020 with altered "Begging segment")	103
Mr. Deity and the Ascension	Mr. Deity has to make a difficult phone call.	June 16, 2021	104
Mr. Deity And The Deity	Mr. Deity experiences the multiverse.	Dec 5, 2022	105
