= Jack Mormon =

Slang term

The term Jack Mormon is a slang term originating in nineteenth-century America. It was originally used to describe a person who was not a baptized member of the Church of Jesus Christ of Latter Day Saints but who was friendly to church members and Mormonism, sympathized with them, or took an active interest in their belief system. Sometime in the early- to mid-twentieth century, however, the term began to refer to an individual deemed by adherents of the Church of Jesus Christ of Latter-day Saints (LDS Church) to be an inactive or lapsed member of the LDS Church who, despite their personal religious viewpoint, maintained good relations with and positive feelings toward the church.

== Origin of the term ==
On April 18, 1845, the term "Jack Mormon" appeared in The Ottawa Free Trader to refer to J. B. Backenstos, the sheriff of Hancock County, who was "friendly to the Mormons, though not one himself." This early published use of the term marks perhaps the earliest appearance of "Jack Mormon" in print, though it was followed soon by other instances in papers such as the New-York Daily Tribune and the Richmond Palladium. Thomas C. Sharp, editor of the Warsaw Signal, also coined the term "Jack-Mason" to refer to those who were sympathetic toward Freemasons in the Anti-Masonic political movement. These sympathetic non-Mormons included Nauvoo Justice of the Peace Daniel H. Wells, who later joined the church, and soldier and diplomat Thomas L. Kane. Kane was identified as a sympathetic Jack Mormon by US Army officials and the media, some of whom asserted that he had been secretly baptised into the LDS faith. However friendly toward the LDS people, Kane remained a Presbyterian all of his life.

Several LDS historians believe that the term was used prior to Sharp's mention, and has ties to sympathetic Democrats in Jackson County, Missouri. Their belief is that the term originated in Missouri, during the Kirtland period of Latter Day Saint history, circa 1834. When Church members were expelled from Jackson County by a mob, a number of them fled to Clay County, where local citizens, mostly Democrats, were sympathetic and friendly toward the Mormons. These citizens were pejoratively labeled "Jack" Mormons by the antagonistic citizens of Jackson County.

During the early 1980s, it was also used as a description of members of the Fundamentalist Church of Jesus Christ of Latter Day Saints (FLDS Church) who broke from the church, in part, over belief in plural marriage.

== Political usage ==
LDS Church membership was made up predominantly of Democrats until the early 1900s, possibly due to anti-Mormon positions held by the Republican party during the latter half of the 19th century. However, the church's conservative positions on social issues such as sexuality, drug use, traditional family values, and the role of religion in government caused large numbers of previously Democratic Latter-day Saints to shift to the Republican Party by the late 1970s. In the late 1970s and early 1980s, the LDS church took a stand against the Equal Rights Amendment, and again increased the population's participation in the Republican party. At that time, a number of members who were registered Democrats were called "Jack Mormons", not as a negative term, but to distinguish them as traditional liberal Democrats. Because of the negative connotation of the term's modern context, this usage was short-lived. An alternative theory and contemporary usage holds that the term refers to a person who is a Mormon in "name only" (as in having a common Mormon surname) as though the "Mormon" label were nothing but a surname to this individual.

The term was made popular by heavyweight champion William Harrison "Jack" Dempsey, born in Manassa, Colorado, on June 24, 1895. During the 1920s, the greatest American sports hero of the day was undoubtedly Babe Ruth; his closest rival was Dempsey, a tough heavyweight boxer from the mining West. Around 1880, an LDS Church missionary converted Dempsey's parents and they moved to the Mormon village of Manassa, Colorado. While his father parted ways with the church, his mother remained a devoted member. Dempsey would write, "I'm proud to be a Mormon. And ashamed to be the Jack Mormon that I am."

== Change in terminology ==
The term is now used to describe a baptized member of the LDS Church who rarely or never practices the religion, but is still friendly toward the church. Alternatively, it can be used for someone that is of Mormon descent but unbaptized or non-religious. Some Jack Mormons still support the goals and beliefs of the LDS Church, but for various reasons choose not to attend services or participate in church activities. They are also colloquially known as Cultural Mormons, the LDS equivalent of a lapsed Catholic, a "Christmas and Easter Christian"/ "Sunday Christian"(or based on an adage "Once a Baptist, Always a Baptist") and a "Yom Kippur Jew" (or sometimes "ethnic Jew").

Some modern LDS youth today use the term to describe a baptized member who chooses not to follow the ethical, moral and cultural guidelines common to Mormons. These guidelines include refraining from profanity and pre-marital sex. Other common cultural limitations include following the Word of Wisdom by consuming a healthy diet, seeking exercise, and avoiding the use of drugs, tobacco, alcohol, and coffee and tea. Often such individuals are noticeable for public consumption of tobacco or alcohol.

It is unclear how or why the meaning of the term changed to its current usage, which is almost the reverse of its original meaning. Preston Nibley, a mid-20th century LDS author who had a large impact on Mormon culture and folklore, mentioned the term in its modern context during the late 1940s and used it extensively in the 1950s.

== In popular culture ==
The term "Jack Mormon" was used by author Edward Abbey in his novel The Monkey Wrench Gang to describe a character, Seldom Seen Smith, who was a Mormon and had multiple wives, but was not active in the LDS Church nor its belief system: "Born by chance into membership in the Church of Jesus Christ of Latter-Day Saints (Mormons), Smith was on lifetime sabbatical from his religion. He was a jack Mormon. A jack Mormon is to a decent Mormon what a jackrabbit is to a cottontail."

In the play Angels in America by Tony Kushner, the character Harper Pitt identifies herself as a Jack Mormon, and postulates an alternate explanation for the origin of the term: "Like jack rabbit...I ran."

In Episode 6 of Season 5 of the AMC television series Hell On Wheels, the character known as Eva identifies herself as a Jack Mormon to the Brigham Young character.

The term is used in its modern meaning by Wallace Stegner in his 1979 novel Recapitulation, set in Salt Lake City.

Jerry Joseph and the Jackmormons is a rock band from Portland, Oregon in the United States.

Jack Mormon Coffee Company is a Salt Lake-based coffee roaster, located in the Historic Avenues district.

American actor Jason Cloud premiered a self-produced play titled Jack Mormon in December 2017 in Vienna, Austria.

== See also ==
- Antinomianism
- Cafeteria Christianity
- Cultural Catholic
- Cultural Christian
- Culture of The Church of Jesus Christ of Latter-day Saints
- Humanistic Judaism
- Lapsed Catholic
- Moralistic therapeutic deism
- Mormon spectrums of orthodoxy and practice
- Sunday Christian
