= First Security Bank =

Financial services company in Arkansas

- Company type: Private
- Industry: Finance
- Founded: 1932 as Security Bank
- Headquarters: Searcy, Arkansas, USA
- Key people: Reynie Rutledge, Chairman
- Products: Credit cards, Loans, deposit products, investments, insurance, financial planning, trust, asset management, and cash management services.
- Total assets: More than $7.8 Billion USD (2021)
- Number of employees: 1000+
- Website: fsbank.com

First Security Bank is a privately held company based in Searcy, Arkansas. It currently operates 78 locations across the state of Arkansas and is a division of Arkansas’ fifth largest bank holding company, First Security Bancorp. First Security owns the recognizable First Security Center in Downtown Little Rock, located in the historic River Market District.

== History ==
First Security was chartered in 1932 in Searcy, Arkansas. In 1966, the name was officially changed to First Security Bank. The bank was originally located at the corner of Arch Street and Spring Street but in 1971 moved to its current location at 314 N. Spring Street, on the corner of Spring Street and Race Street.

In 1977, Reynie Rutledge purchased First Security Bank and, in 1981, created a bank-holding company that later became known as First Security Bancorp. Through the years, First Security Bancorp acquired and established several financial organizations to create Arkansas’ sixth largest bank-holding company.

In 2004, First Security opened its first branch in Little Rock on Cantrell Road. Soon after, construction was completed on the First Security Center in the Little Rock Rivermarket District.

In 2014, First Security had over $4 billion in assets and 900 employees working in 72 locations throughout the state.

== Services and locations ==
First Security sells a variety of financial products and services including personal, commercial and mortgage loans; all types of checking and savings accounts; certificates of deposit; debit cards, trust services; safe deposit boxes; wire transfers; internet and mobile banking; and locally issued Visa/MasterCard credit cards.

First Security Bank has banking centers located in: Beebe, Benton, Bentonville, Bryant, Bull Shoals, Cabot, Centerton, Clarksville, Clinton, Conway, Farmington, Fayetteville, Fort Smith, Gassville, Greenbrier, Heber Springs, Hot Springs, Jonesboro, Judsonia, Little Rock, Lowell, Maumelle, Mayflower, McRae, Mountain Home, Mountain View, North Little Rock, Pangburn, Prairie Creek, Russellville, Rogers, Searcy, Sherwood, Springdale and Vilonia, as well as one location outside of Arkansas in Santa Rosa Beach, Florida.

== Sources ==
- First Security Takes Long View http://www.arkansasbusiness.com/article.aspx?aID=124269.54928.136392&view=all&link=perm
- First Security Content To Grow Within Arkansas http://www.arkansasbusiness.com/article.aspx?aID=124081
- Bank Deposits Grow 5% in Arkansas, Says FDIC http://www.arkansasbusiness.com/article.aspx?aID=124075.54928.136216
- First Security Bank
- End of Era: Union Bank Sale Closes http://www.bentoncourier.com/content/view/136433/1/
- Top 5 Biggest Banks in Arkansas http://www.todaysthv.com/news/business/story.aspx?storyid=103962&catid=119
- Arkansas Banks Outperform National Average http://www.talkbusiness.net/article/ARKANSAS-BANKS-OUTPERFORMING-NATIONAL-AVERAGE/462/
- Bank of Ozarks, First Security Ranked Tops in Region by SNL Financial http://www.arkansasbusiness.com/article.aspx?aID=131129.54928.143268
- http://www.fdic.gov
- http://www.fsbancorp.com/about_us.htm
