= Less-active Mormon =

Members of LDS Church who are not actively participating

Less active Mormon is a term used by members of the Church of Jesus Christ of Latter-day Saints to describe a person who is not actively participating, but who is still on its membership records. These are individuals who do not attend the Church's services and are not otherwise involved in its activities or callings. Some less-active members maintain good relations with and positive feelings toward the Church. Reasons for disengagement can include lifestyle issues and problems with social integration.

The LDS Church does not release statistics on church activity, but about 60 percent of its members in the United States and 70 percent worldwide are less active or inactive. Activity rates vary with age, and disengagement occurs most frequently between age 16 and 25. Young single adults are also more likely to become inactive than their married counterparts, and overall, women tend to be more active than men. A 1998 study showed that a majority of less-active members return to church activity later in life. Further research has shown that "a completed mission correlates well with staying Mormon for the long term, even among people who were not very active in the LDS Church growing up. In other words, eight in ten people who had been less active as kids were still Mormon in adulthood if they had served a full-term mission."

== See also ==
- The Church of Jesus Christ of Latter-day Saints membership statistics
- Culture of The Church of Jesus Christ of Latter-day Saints
