= Exmormon Foundation =

Non-profit organization

The Exmormon Foundation is a non-profit, non-sectarian organization that supports people transitioning out of affiliation with the Church of Jesus Christ of Latter-day Saints (LDS Church). It was founded by Richard Packham in 2001. He left the LDS Church after concluding from his personal research that he did not believe its teachings, particularly the historical teachings of the Adam–God doctrine.

The foundation holds an annual conference in Salt Lake City, Utah in October, the same month as one of the LDS Church's semi-annual general conferences. Notable speakers at the Exmormon Foundation Conference have included musician Tal Bachman, Flora Jessop and Linda Walker of the Child Protection Project, Dr. Simon Southerton, Brent Lee Metcalfe, Steven Hassan, Stanford professor Craig Criddle, Jeff Sharlet, John Larsen, Grant H. Palmer, John Dehlin, and Pat Bagley.

The Recovery from Mormonism website also includes a catalog of short auto-biographies where ex-Mormons describe their loss of faith in Mormonism.
