= John Dehlin =

American podcast host

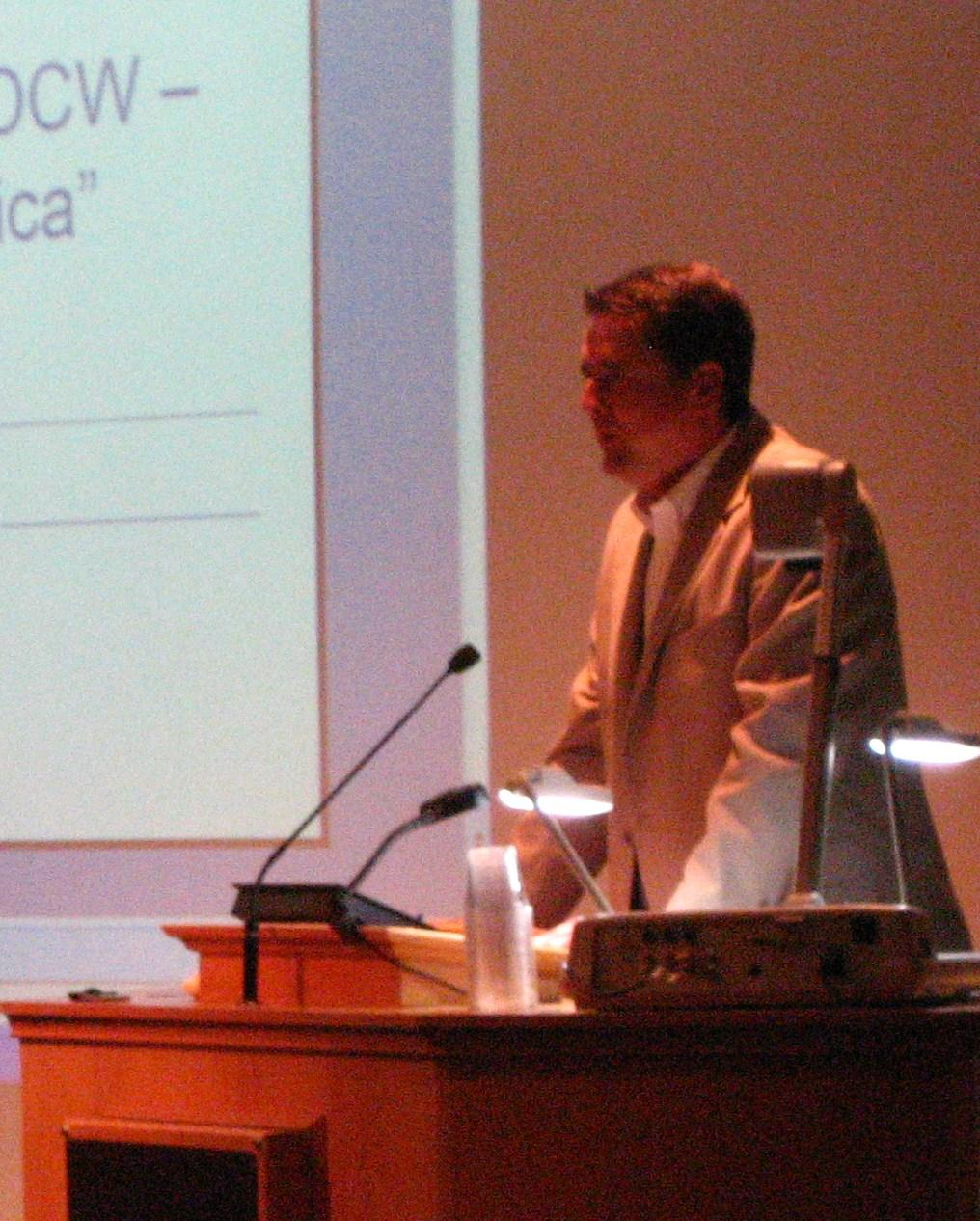
- Dehlin speaking in 2007
- Born: John Parkinson Dehlin; Boise, Idaho, U.S.
- Education: Brigham Young University (BA); Utah State University (MS, PhD)
- Occupations: Podcaster and Pundit; Faith crisis coach
- Spouse: Margi Weber Dehlin
- Website: johndehlin.com

John Parkinson Dehlin (/dəˈlɪn/) is an American podcast host. He holds a PhD in psychology. Dehlin founded the Mormon Stories Podcast, as well as several other podcasts, blogs, and websites. He was an influential early participant in the "Mormon blogosphere," and blogs at Patheos.com. He advocates for LGBT rights. In January 2015, Dehlin was excommunicated from the Church of Jesus Christ of Latter-day Saints (LDS Church) on the grounds he committed apostasy by being publicly critical of church leaders and the church's treatment of LGBTQ members.

== Early life and education ==
Born in Boise, Idaho, and raised in Katy, Texas, he attended Brigham Young University (BYU) in Provo, Utah. He graduated summa cum laude with a Bachelor of Arts degree in political science in 1993. In 2007, Dehlin completed a Master of Science degree in Instructional Technology. In 2015, he received a doctorate in clinical and counseling psychology from Utah State University (USU).

== Career ==
=== Early career ===
After graduation, Dehlin worked for five years in software and as a consultant for Bain & Company, Arthur Andersen, Citicorp, Heidrick & Struggles, and the LDS Church. He then worked at Microsoft for seven years in programs for developers, marketing, speech technologies, and product demos.

In 2004, Dehlin moved to Logan, Utah, to begin work under David A. Wiley at USU on OpenCourseWare-related projects. Dehlin would serve two years as USU's OpenCourseWare Consortium Coordinator and Director of Outreach for the Center for Open and Sustainable Learning, promoting OpenCourseWare to other universities, and a few years as director of the OpenCourseWare Consortium for the Massachusetts Institute of Technology (MIT). In January 2007, MIT hired Dehlin as the Director of the OpenCourseWare Consortium.

=== Sunstone ===
During Dehlin's early career, he developed massive open online courses (MOOCs) and branched into Latter-day Saint-themed new media. Dehlin approached the Sunstone Education Foundation and presented to its board of directors the importance of participating in developing internet communities through blogging and podcasting in order to address the then-limited internet presence for constructive intellectual sources. The Board accepted his offer to initiate these programs and, in September 2005, Dehlin joined the board of directors and began a Sunstone podcast as well as SunstoneBlog. In July 2007, he also became executive director of the Sunstone Education Foundation, in which he was to focus on strategic initiatives to strengthen Sunstone's position as an open forum for issues within the Latter-day Saint community. In that role, he increased organizational focus on its longstanding motto, "faith seeking understanding," and worked to attract new and younger membership. Dehlin resigned from Sunstone in January 2008.

=== Mormon Stories ===
In September 2005, after experiencing doubts in his faith and subsequently finding reasons to remain a member of the LDS Church, Dehlin created the Mormon Stories podcast as an open discussion of Latter-day Saint issues, intending to give listeners reasons to remain in the church. Through interviews, Mormon Stories focused on varying religious experiences and perspectives. Mormon Stories has been featured in many venues, including being broadcast on KVNU in Logan, Utah.

Intermittently conflicted about continuing Mormon Stories, Dehlin stopped and restarted the project a few times. In January 2010, Dehlin resumed the blog and podcast, focusing on faith crises and mental illness. The podcast has featured many notable guests, beginning with interviews of Joanna Brooks and John C. Hamer. Two other regular hosts joined Dehlin in conducting interviews for the podcast: Dan Wotherspoon, former editor of Sunstone magazine; and Natasha Helfer Parker, a licensed clinical marriage and family therapist.

=== Open Stories Foundation ===
The Open Stories Foundation is a 501(c)(3) non-profit organization created in January 2011. Dehlin has been criticized for the lack of financial transparency and oversight in his nonprofit umbrella organization, Open Stories Foundation. In 2022, the Salt Lake Tribune reported several former employees of Open Stories Foundation filed a complaint with the IRS alleging Dehlin and the foundation "'curated' its board membership to boost his compensation and blur lines between donations and personal expenses amid what they assert was lax supervision." According to nonprofit tax reports, Dehlin's personal annual compensation grew by more than 700% between 2010 and 2019. His annual compensation of $236,021 in 2019 represented 60% of Open Stories Foundation's total earnings from podcast revenues and donors. James Patterson, a former associate producer for Dehlin, wrote in his whistleblower complaint to the IRS, that "Dehlin sees Open Stories Foundation as his and his alone, with an independent board of directors merely a roadblock to him achieving his personal financial goals."

=== Other blogs ===
In June 2007, Dehlin started Mormon Matters as a blog and weekly podcast. The format was a discussion panel on events, culture, politics and spirituality within the LDS Church. Panelists were to represent different sides of each issue, although the show later struggled to retain faithful Latter-day Saint panelists. In early 2008, Dehlin converted Mormon Matters into a group blog and lessened emphasis on new podcast episodes. Dehlin resumed the Mormon Matters podcast on March 5, 2011, with Dan Wotherspoon as the host and Joanna Brooks as a frequent co-host.

Dehlin is also the co-founder of the pro-LGBTQ "Mormons for Marriage" website. He co-founded the now-defunct Stay LDS, a community that was dedicated to helping "unorthodox Mormons" stay in the LDS Church.

Dehlin briefly blogged at a non-partisan religion website, Patheos.com, in a current-issues/events dialogue format with Mormon studies scholar Patrick Q. Mason.

== LDS Church membership ==
From 1988 to 1990, Dehlin served as an LDS Church missionary in Guatemala. According to Dehlin, his mission began baptizing up to 700 converts per month using practices he believed to be deceptive. After reporting this to his mission president, Dehlin was transferred to an area that stoked his allergies, and he was subsequently sent home. He chose to resume missionary service and was reassigned to finish his two-year term in Tempe, Arizona. Dehlin remained an active member of the LDS Church for the next 20 years.

In the spring of 2011, Dehlin stated he had become inactive in the church (i.e., not attending weekly services), citing an inability to believe some of its claims.

In 2014, Dehlin was investigated by his local church leaders regarding his online activity, culminating in a request by Dehlin for greater privacy. Prior to 2014, Dehlin had faced church disciplinary hearings without any resulting disciplinary action. In January 2015, Dehlin's stake president initiated another disciplinary council, which determined Dehlin's online activity constituted apostasy. He was excommunicated for "conduct contrary to the laws and order of the church." Dehlin appealed to the First Presidency on March 10, 2015, stating his actions had not met the church's definition of apostasy. In July and August 2015, the First Presidency notified Dehlin via his stake president of the denial of his appeal.

== See also ==
- Jeremy Runnells
- Kate Kelly
