= Culture of the Church of Jesus Christ of Latter-day Saints =

The basic beliefs and traditions of the Church of Jesus Christ of Latter-day Saints (LDS Church) have a cultural impact that distinguishes church members, practices and activities. The culture is geographically concentrated in the Mormon Corridor in the United States, and is present to a lesser extent in many places of the world where Latter-day Saints live.

In some aspects, Latter-day Saint culture is distinct from church doctrine. Cultural practices which are centrally based on church doctrine include adhering to the church's law of health, paying tithing, living the law of chastity, participation in lay leadership of the church, refraining from work on Sundays when possible, family home evenings, and ministering to other church members.

The majority of Latter-day Saints live outside the United States. Therefore, even though the global differences are important, there are some common traits around Latter-day Saints worldwide.

== Media and arts ==
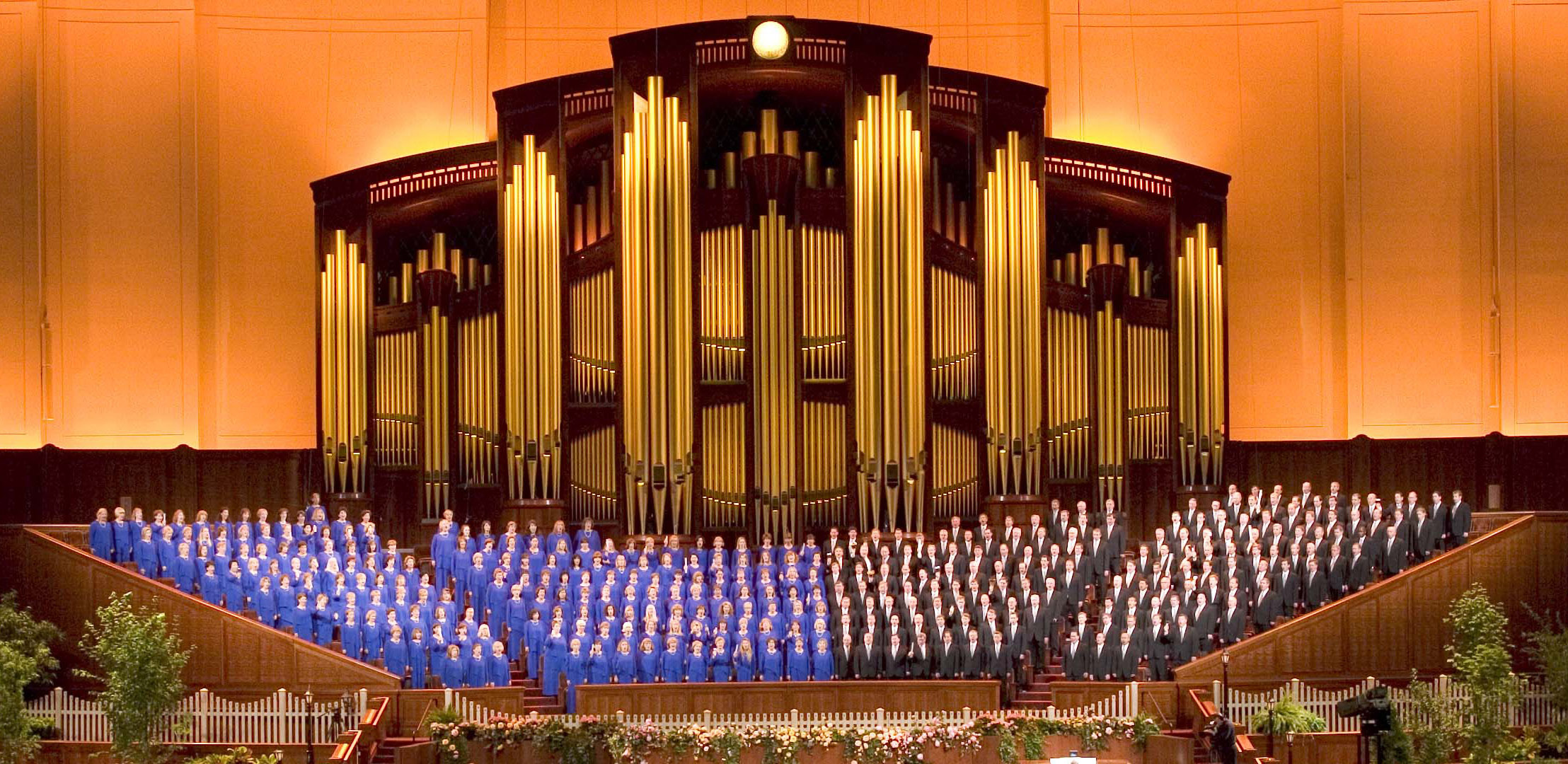
The Church-sponsored Tabernacle Choir at Temple Square has received various awards and travelled extensively since its inception.

LDS-themed media includes cinema, fiction, websites, and graphical art such as photography and paintings. The church owns a chain of bookstores called Deseret Book, which provide a channel through which publications are sold; church leaders have authored books and sold them through the publishing arm of the bookstore. BYU TV, the church-sponsored television station, also airs on several networks. The church also produces several pageants annually depicting various events of the primitive and modern-day church. Its Easter pageant Jesus the Christ has been identified as the "largest annual outdoor Easter pageant in the world". The church encourages entertainment without violence, sexual content, or vulgar language; many church members specifically avoid rated-R movies.

The church's official choir, the Tabernacle Choir at Temple Square, was formed in the mid-19th century and performs in the Salt Lake Tabernacle. They have travelled to more than 28 countries, and are considered one of the most famous choirs in the world. The choir has received a Grammy Award, four Emmy Awards, two Peabody Awards, and the National Medal of Arts.

Notable members of the church in the media and arts include: Donny Osmond, an American singer, dancer, and actor; Orson Scott Card, author of Ender's Game; Stephenie Meyer, author of the Twilight series; and Glenn Beck, a conservative radio host, television producer, and author. Notable productions related to the church, though produced by individuals not affiliated with it, include Murder Among the Mormons, a 2021 Netflix documentary; and The Book of Mormon, a big-budget musical about Mormon missionaries, which received nine Tony Awards.

== Family structure ==
Church culture puts notable emphasis on the family, and the distinctive concept of a united family which lives and progresses forever is at the core of Latter-day Saint doctrine. Church leaders encourage members to marry and have children, and as a result, Latter-day Saint families tend to be larger than average. All sexual activity outside of marriage is considered a serious sin. All homosexual activity is considered sinful and same-sex marriages are not performed or supported by the LDS Church. Latter-day Saint fathers who hold the priesthood typically name and bless their children shortly after birth to formally give the child a name and generate a church record for them.

LDS Church members are encouraged to set aside one evening each week, typically Monday, to spend together in "Family Home Evening." Family Home Evenings typically consist of gathering as a family to study the faith's gospel principles, and other family activities. Daily family prayer is also encouraged.

== Education ==
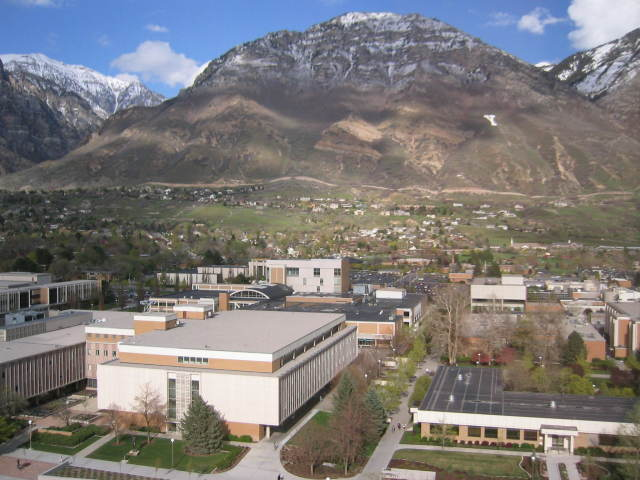
Brigham Young University in Provo, Utah

Latter-day Saints believe that one of the most important aspects of life on Earth is the opportunity for individuals to learn and grow. They further believe that whatever learning they obtain in this life is retained in the next life. Accordingly, the church strongly emphasizes education and as part of the Church Educational System, subsidizes Brigham Young University (BYU) and its Jerusalem Center, BYU–Idaho, BYU–Hawaii, and Ensign College.

All participating members ages eleven years and older attend Sunday School classes, which emphasize personal scripture studies and other forms of spiritual education and self-improvement.

Seminary is an established religious education program for secondary school students, which is often scheduled before or after school hours. In some areas with large LDS populations, provisions are made by the school to allow students to attend Seminary off-campus during the school day. Attendance at seminary is voluntary, although it is considered when a person applies to a church-owned university. CES administers the seminary program and an Institute of Religion program for tertiary education-age church members.

The church sponsors a low-interest educational loan program known as the Perpetual Education Fund. This fund is designed to benefit young men and women from developing areas to receive student loans. Many of them have served a mission, returned to their home, and lack needed funds to improve their standard of living. As they finish their education and enter the work force, they pay back the funds, which are then loaned to other individuals.

== Recreation and activities ==
The LDS Church encourages and hosts social activities such as sports, dances, picnics, holiday parties, and/or musical presentations. Local Young Men and Young Women organizations sponsor weekly activities, and the Primary and other auxiliaries of the church hold occasional activities.

Beginning with the new youth initiative in 2020, during the summer, the LDS Church provides week-long experiences, known as For the Strength of Youth Conferences. Previous to For the Strength of Youth Conferences, a popular youth-centered religious program called Especially for Youth was offered through church-owned Brigham Young University. Since announcing For the Strength of Youth Conferences, the size and scope of Especially for Youth has been reduced dramatically.

== Politics ==
In general, the LDS Church distances itself from politics, although it encourages its members to be politically active. Each summer in U.S. election years the church sends a letter to each bishop to be read from the pulpit stating that the church does not endorse any political parties or candidates, does not allow its buildings to be used for political events, and that no titles or positions that a person may have in the church may be used to imply church endorsement of any party or candidate.

However, the church has endorsed or opposed specific political positions which it regards as moral issues:

- Opposition to repeal of right-to-work section of the Taft–Hartley Act
- Opposition to MX (Peacekeeper) missile bases in Utah and Nevada
- Opposition to the Equal Rights Amendment during the 1970s
- Support for anti-same-sex marriage legislation: the Defense of Marriage Act, California Proposition 22, 2004 Utah constitutional amendment, and California Proposition 8
- Opposition to the storage of nuclear waste in Utah
- Opposition to white supremacism
- Support of compassionate and pro-family immigration policy, while affirming that "every nation has the right to enforce its laws and secure its borders"
- Support for the Respect for Marriage Act to preserve LGBT rights along with including appropriate religious freedom protections.

A 2012 Pew Center survey on Religion and Public Life indicates that 74 percent of U.S. Latter-day Saints church members lean towards the Republican Party. Some liberal members have stated that they feel that they have to defend their worthiness due to political differences. In recent decades, the Republican Party has consistently won a majority of the LDS vote in most national and state-level elections. As a result, Utah, a state with a majority LDS population, is also one of the most heavily Republican states in the country. However, there are Democratic supporters inside the church.

== Genealogy ==
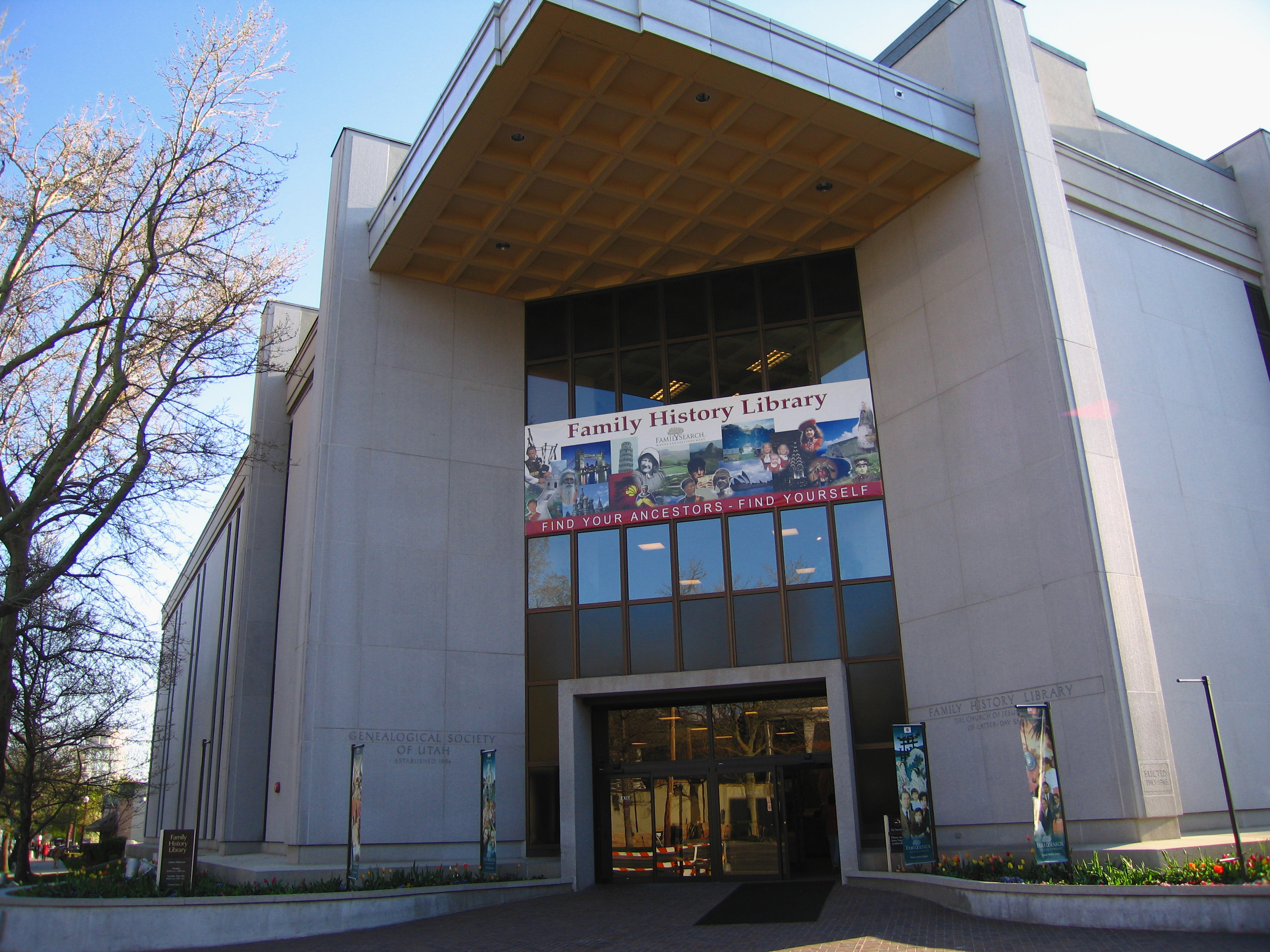
The church's Family History Library in Salt Lake City

Genealogical family history research is an important aspect of Latter-day Saint tradition, stemming from a doctrinal mandate for church members to research their family tree and perform vicarious ordinances for their ancestors. Church members believe the ordinances "seal" or link families together, with the ultimate goal being an unbroken chain back to Adam and Eve. Church members are able to do genealogical work in various family history centers throughout the world, usually located in LDS meetinghouses. The advent of personal computers prompted the church to create a specialized file format known as GEDCOM for storing and exchanging these records. Since then, GEDCOM has become a de facto standard that almost all genealogy programs support.

The church maintains a website called FamilySearch to access genealogical records, which typically contain birth, death, marriage and family group information. Church records also contain information on personal ordinances of members as well as vicarious temple ordinances such as baptism, endowment, and sealing to spouse, parent, and child. Genealogical and church related information is maintained in permanent storage in the Granite Mountain vault in the Wasatch Range of the Utah mountains. The church is currently working to digitize all of these records and make them more readily available.

== Death ==
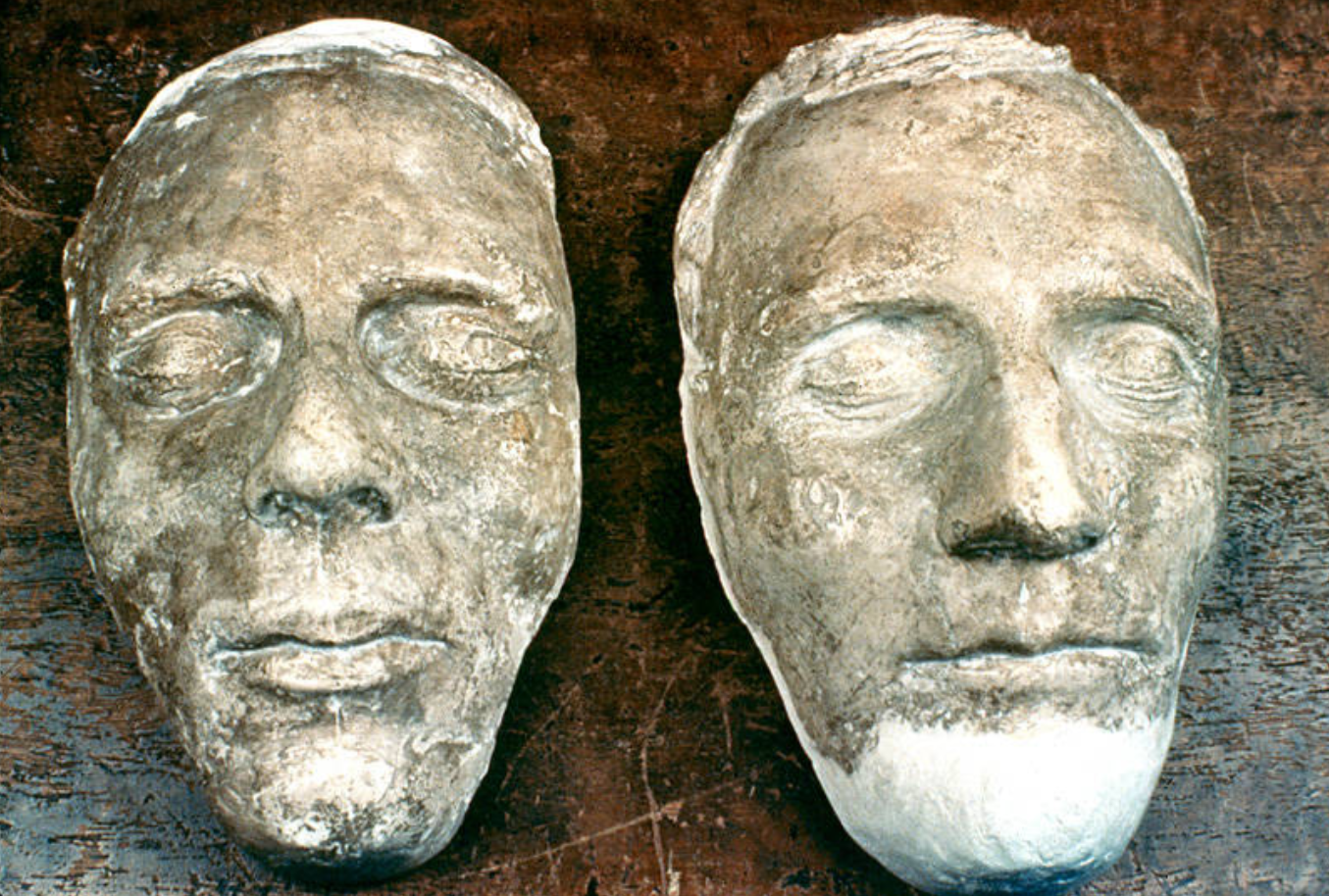
Death masks of Joseph and Hyrum Smith

In the 1800s, members of the LDS Church participated in unique burial and death rituals whenever a fellow Latter-day Saint died. Relief Society women were responsible for washing and dressing corpses, especially in the years before mortuary science came to Utah. They sewed special burial clothes for the person; endowed members of the church were buried in their sacred temple clothes. Those who were not endowed were simply dressed in white. If a mother and child died during delivery, both were buried in the same coffin, with the baby laid in the mother's arms. The Latter-day Saints also buried their dead facing east so that they would be situated correctly to witness the second coming of Jesus Christ. In addition to caring for the bodies of the deceased, LDS women were also responsible for planning funeral services. These involved singing songs, saying prayers, and listening to funeral sermons, which were often given by at least one man possessing the Melchizedek priesthood. Sermons and eulogies included a reference to the continuation of the person's spirit and the many admirable spiritual qualities they demonstrated during their life. Especially towards the end of the 19th century, funeral planners opted to decorate with white instead of black. To remember the deceased, the Latter-day Saints made death masks and canes from the wood of coffins. They also kept locks of the person's hair. LDS women wrote death poetry to express their thoughts and feelings, and many such poems were published in periodicals such as the Woman's Exponent.

Before the actual event of death, the early Latter-day Saints attempted to revive the dying through healing rituals. These involved placing a drop of consecrated oil on the person's head and saying a prayer to bless them with health. Less unique to the early Mormons was their involvement in the 19th-century American Protestant phenomenon known as the "beautiful death". This involved gathering together to witness a person's death. The dying were to give parting advice to their children and remain calm in their last hours. It was very important to have as many loved ones as possible be present at the deathbed scene; a private death was undesirable.

== Missionaries ==
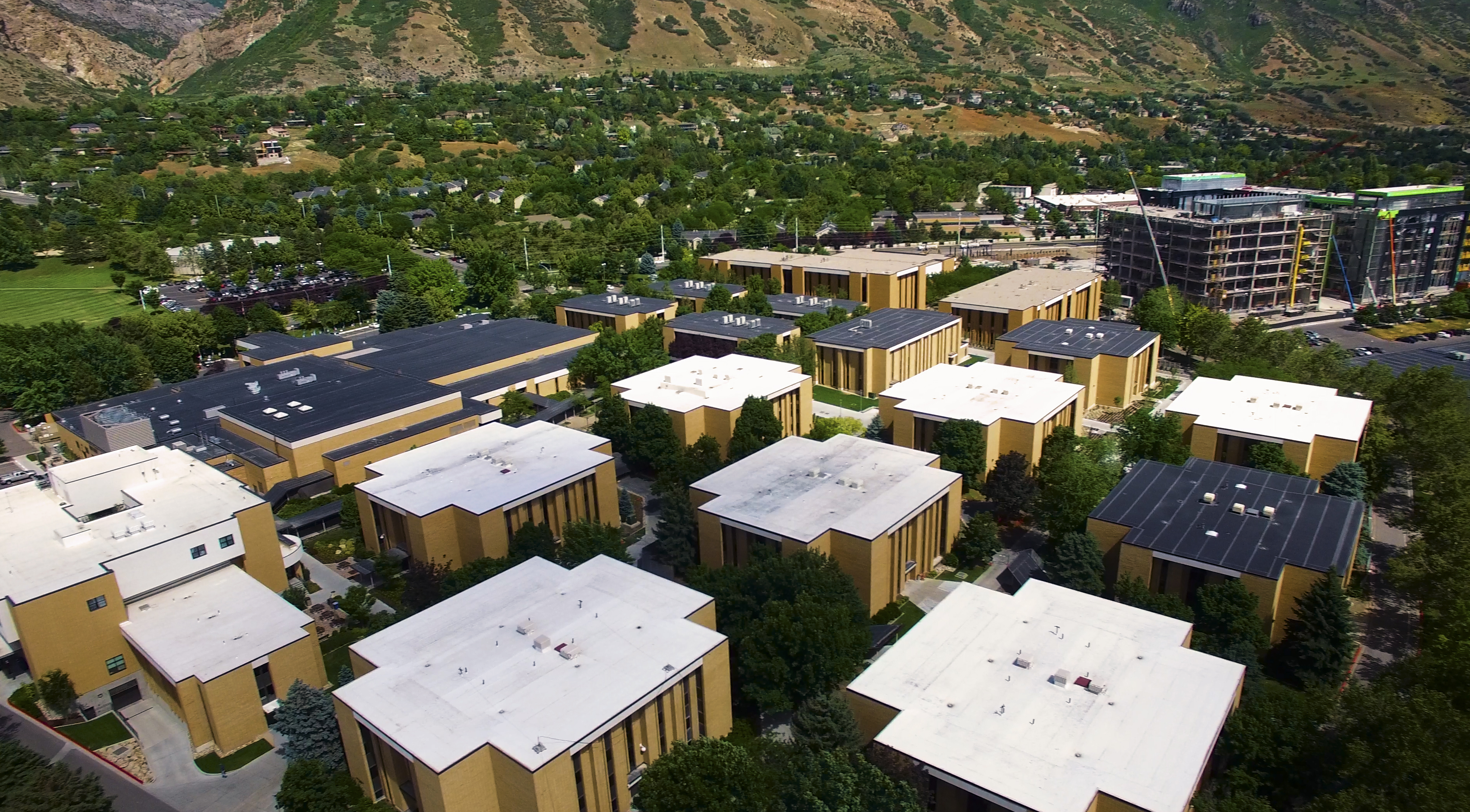
The Provo Missionary Training Center

The LDS Church has one of the most active missionary programs of any world church. During the church's general conference in October 2014, Thomas S. Monson noted that there were in excess of 88,000 full-time LDS missionaries serving without pay around the world. Young men and young women can begin serving at age 18, young men serving for 2 years, and young women serving for 18 months; missionaries frequently learn another language and typically are assigned far from their homes, however some may be assigned to a service mission where they serve in their local communities.

Missionary work is a fundamental principle of the church and has become one of its most readily identifiable characteristics. Church headquarters assigns missionaries to their area of work, which can be in any part of the world where governments allow them. It also directs the missionary whether to focus on proselytizing, humanitarian work, or family history work.

== Preparedness ==
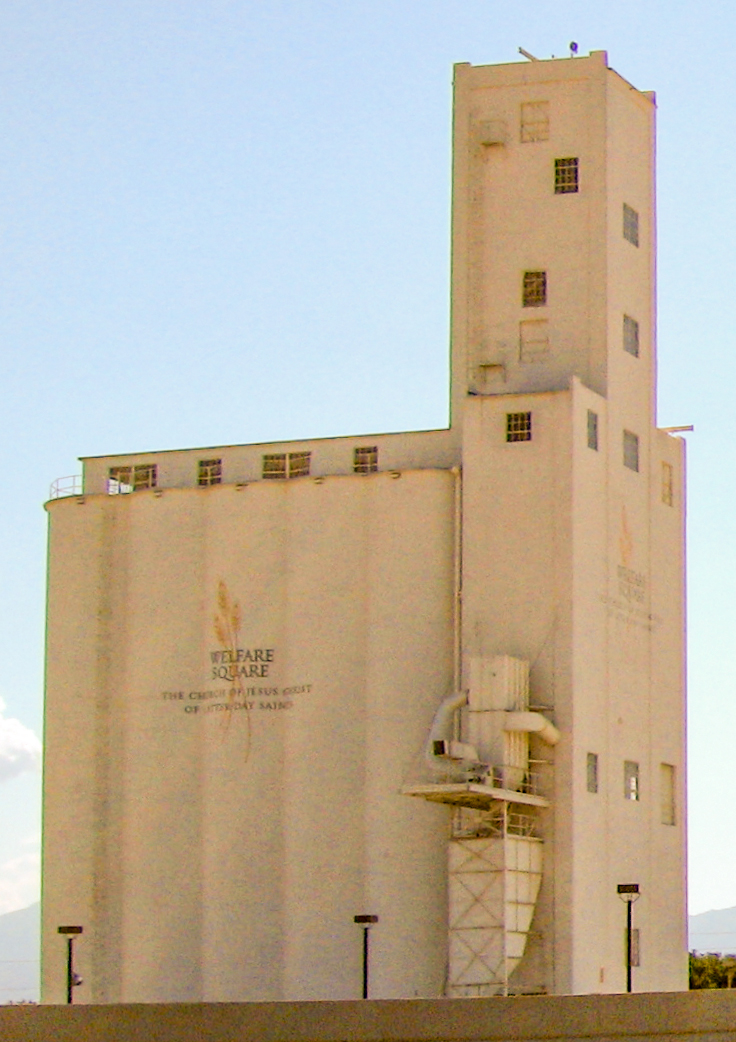
Welfare Square's 178-foot-tall grain elevator in Salt Lake City

The LDS Church encourages every member to be prepared for all types of disasters, including economic difficulties. Members are encouraged to plant gardens, store at least three months' supply of food and water, and to maintain a "72-hour Kit" (or "3-Day Pack") containing necessary supplies to immediately sustain oneself in the event of a natural disaster. The church is equipped with necessities which are available for rapid distribution, but members are expected to see to their own immediate needs, as well as assisting their neighbors and communities. The church's response to emergencies or disasters is directed through the bishop's storehouse, and is not limited to assisting church members.

== Cuisine ==
Popular food items in the culture, particularly within the Mormon Corridor, include funeral potatoes, jello salad, Apple Beer, frogeye salad, "scones" (actually a deep-fried dough bearing little resemblance to a traditional scone), and varieties of fry sauce.

== Public speaking ==
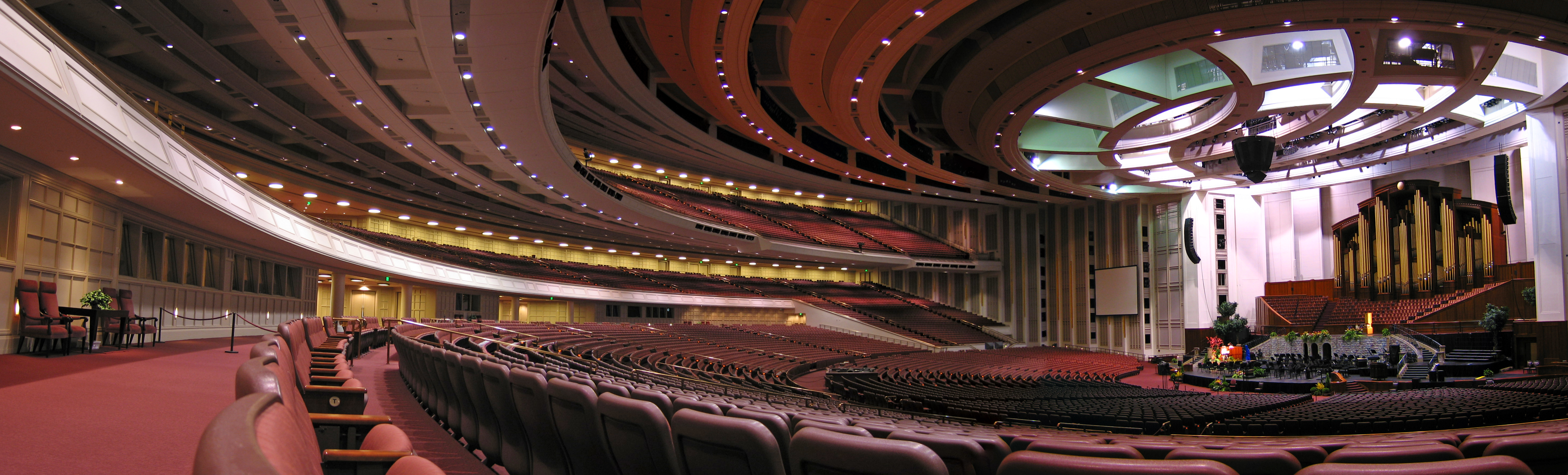
Interior of the LDS Conference Center where the church holds its semi-annual general conference

The LDS Church has a long and rich tradition of public speaking. Public speaking is common for both leaders and other lay members. This speaking tradition continues today. For example, during worship services on the first Sunday of each month, members of the congregation are invited to extemporaneously share their testimonies of the gospel, faith-building experiences, and other uplifting messages with other members of the congregation.

On each of the other Sundays during the month, members of the congregation ages 12 and older are selected in advance to give a "talk" (a "sermon" or "homily") on a particular gospel principle or topic. Children under age 12 are given the opportunity to give short talks in their Primary meetings.

Church leaders and missionaries are also encouraged to speak boldly and freely about the church, and are often given opportunities for extemporaneous public speaking on various gospel subjects.

Since the early days of the church, talks given by leaders (especially those given in the church's biannual general conference meetings) have been recorded and widely distributed in written format. A digitized collection of these talks dating back to 1971 is available on the churchofjesuschrist.org website, and talks dating back to the 19th century are available in printed format through various university and community libraries. In recent years, the LDS Church and BYU have also made audio and video versions of selected talks freely available on their websites.

== Symbols ==
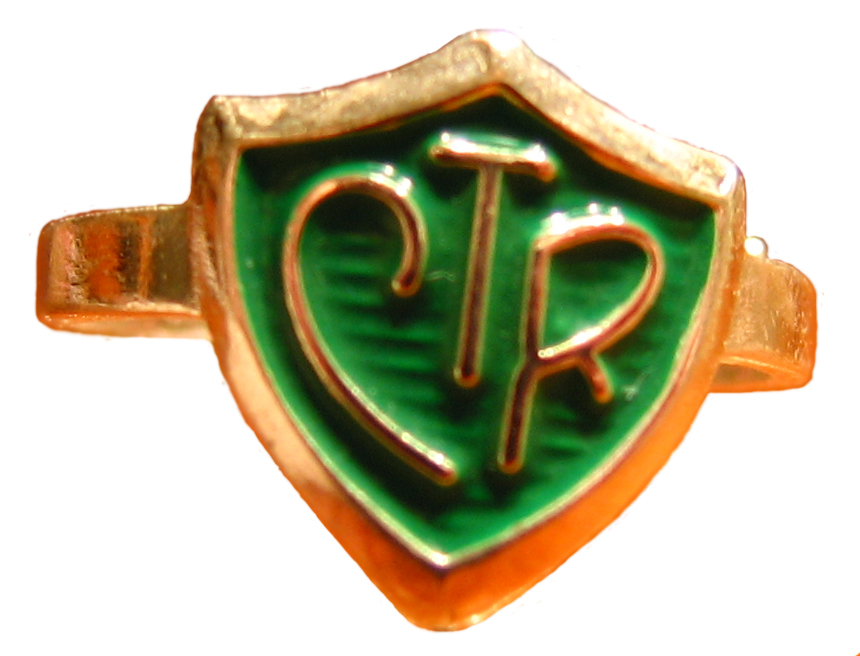
A CTR ring is a common symbol of the church. It reminds its wearer to "Choose the Right."

One of the most commonly used visual symbols of the church is the trumpeting angel Moroni, proclaiming the restoration of the gospel to the Earth (often identified as the angel mentioned in Revelation 14:6-7). A statue depicting Moroni tops the tallest spire of most LDS temples. Other common symbols associated with the church are the letters CTR, meaning "Choose the Right", often depicted in a shield logo; the Christus statue; and images of the Salt Lake Temple.

The modern LDS Church does not use the cross or crucifix as a symbol of faith. Mormons generally view such symbols as emphasizing the death of Jesus rather than his life and resurrection. The early LDS Church was more accepting of the symbol of the cross, but after the turn of the 20th century, an aversion to it developed in Mormon culture. However, there are individual Latter-day Saints who tolerate (or even embrace) the use of a cross as a personal symbol of faith.

By current policy, no pictures or icons are depicted in the chapel within modern LDS meetinghouses, in order to avoid an image becoming the focus of worship rather than the reality of God. However, images such as paintings of Christ and photographs of LDS leaders and temples are common in other parts of church buildings.

In 1994, church president Howard W. Hunter encouraged church members to "look to the temple […] as the great symbol of your membership." When questioned on the subject of symbols in 2005, church president Gordon B. Hinckley said that Latter-day Saints themselves are the best symbols of their religion.

== Music ==
A number of songs and hymns are unique to the church. Among the most famous of these are "Come, Come, Ye Saints", "I Am a Child of God"', "The Spirit of God Like a Fire Is Burning", "Praise to the Man", "O My Father", "High on the Mountain Top", and "We Thank Thee, O God, for a Prophet".

== Cultural restrictions and taboos ==
=== Abortion and birth control ===
The LDS Church opposes elective abortion "for personal or social convenience" but states that abortion could be an acceptable option in cases of rape, incest, danger to the health or life of the mother, or where the fetus has been diagnosed with "severe defects that will not allow the baby to survive beyond birth." The current church stance on birth control is that decisions about its use and "the consequences of those decisions rest solely with each married couple" and that they should consider "the physical and mental health of the mother and father and their capacity to provide the basic necessities of life for their children" when planning a family. The church discourages surgical sterilization, like vasectomies and tubal ligation, and historically encouraged members to only use these options for serious medical conditions after discussing it with a bishop. In the past the use of birth control methods including artificial contraception was explicitly condemned by certain LDS Church leaders.

=== Alcohol, tobacco, coffee, and tea ===
The LDS Church's health code, called the Word of Wisdom, prohibits the consumption of alcohol, tobacco, and "hot drinks"; church leaders have defined "hot drinks" as "coffee and tea". Caffeinated beverages other than coffee and tea are not prohibited by the LDS Church.

=== Beards ===
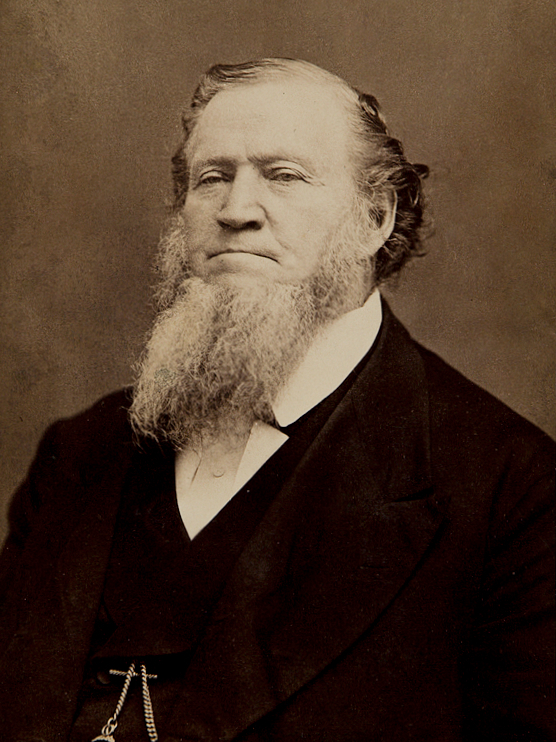
Many early LDS Church leaders (such as Brigham Young, pictured) wore beards.

After Joseph Smith, all of the presidents of the LDS Church wore beards until 1951. However, since David O. McKay became church president in that year, LDS Church presidents have all been clean-shaven. Since the 1960s, the LDS Church has discouraged men from wearing beards, particularly those who serve in ecclesiastical leadership positions. The church's current preference for clean-shaven men has no theological basis, but stems from social changes associating facial hair with the hippie and drug culture aspects of the counterculture of the 1960s.

The church maintain no formal policy on facial hair for its general membership. However, formal prohibitions against facial hair are enforced for young men entering missionary service. Students and staff of the church-sponsored schools that make up the Church Educational System, such as Brigham Young University, are required to adhere to the Church Educational System Honor Code, which requires that men be clean-shaven. A beard exception is granted for "serious skin conditions", and for approved theatrical performances, but until 2015 no exception was given for any other reason, including religious convictions. In January 2015, BYU clarified that non-Mormon students who wish to have a beard for religious reasons, such as Muslims or Sikhs, may be granted permission after applying for an exception.

In 2014, BYU students started a campaign to loosen the beard restrictions, but it had the opposite effect: some who had previously been granted beard exceptions were found to no longer qualify, and for part of a week LDS Business College required students with a registered exception to wear a "beard badge", which was likened to a "badge of shame". Some students joined in with shaming fellow beard-wearing students.

=== Immodest dress ===
The LDS Church has stated "[r]evealing and sexually suggestive clothing, which includes short shorts and skirts, tight clothing, and shirts that do not cover the stomach, can stimulate desires and actions that violate the Lord's law of chastity." The church therefore encourages its members to dress modestly. Men and women who have undergone the endowment ceremony in church temples are instructed to wear a temple garment as undergarments for the remainder of their lives; the temple garment is intended to cover the trunk of the body from the neck to the knees as well as the upper part of the arms.

=== Interracial marriages ===
In the LDS Church, interracial marriage has traditionally been discouraged, and as late as 1947 was taught to be against church doctrine.

During a sermon criticizing the federal government, church president Brigham Young said, "[i]f the white man who belongs to the chosen seed mixes his blood with the seed of Cain, the penalty, under the law of God, is death on the spot. This will always be so." (The "seed of Cain" has generally been understood to refer to black people of African descent.)

In 1954, church apostle Mark E. Petersen stated that: "I think I have read enough to give you an idea of what the Negro is after. He is not just seeking the opportunity of sitting down in a cafe where white people eat. He isn't just trying to ride on the same streetcar or the same Pullman car with white people. It isn't that he just desires to go to the same theater as the white people. From this, and other interviews I have read, it appears that the Negro seeks absorption with the white race. He will not be satisfied until he achieves it by intermarriage. That is his objective and we must face it."

In a 1965 address to BYU students, apostle Spencer W. Kimball told BYU students: "Now, the brethren feel that it is not the wisest thing to cross racial lines in dating and marrying. There is no condemnation. We have had some of our fine young people who have crossed the lines. We hope they will be very happy, but experience of the brethren through a hundred years has proved to us that marriage is a very difficult thing under any circumstances and the difficulty increases in interrace marriages."

The official newspaper of the LDS Church, the Church News, printed an article entitled "Interracial marriage discouraged" in the 17 June 1978 issue, the same issue that announced the policy reversal which allowed men of black African descent to be ordained to the priesthood.

Throughout history, there has not been a church policy on interracial marriages, which had been permitted since before the 1978 reversal. In 1978, church spokesman Don LeFevre said that "there is no ban on interracial marriage. If a black partner contemplating marriage is worthy of going to the Temple, nobody's going to stop him [...] if he's ready to go to the Temple, obviously he may go with the blessings of the church."

Speaking on behalf of the church, Robert Millet wrote in 2003: "[T]he Church Handbook of Instructions […] is the guide for all Church leaders on doctrine and practice. There is, in fact, no mention whatsoever in this handbook concerning interracial marriages. In addition, having served as a Church leader for almost 30 years, I can also certify that I have never received official verbal instructions condemning marriages between black and white members."

A church lesson manual for adolescent boys, published in 1995 and in use until 2013, contains a 1976 quote from Spencer W. Kimball that says, "We recommend that people marry those who are of the same racial background generally, and of somewhat the same economic and social and educational background (some of those are not an absolute necessity, but preferred), and above all, the same religious background, without question".

=== Masturbation ===
On many occasions spanning over a century, church leaders have taught that adherents should not masturbate as part of obedience to the code of conduct known as the law of chastity. Although rhetoric has softened and become less direct, the prohibition on masturbation remains in place, but its enforcement and the opinions of local leadership vary. Additionally, the majority of church adherents' views are at odds with those of top church leaders on the subject. During regular annual worthiness interviews LDS adherents—including preteens and teenagers—are required to confess of any serious sexual sins like masturbation to church leaders in order to repent and be considered worthy to participate in the weekly sacrament or in temple rites like baptisms for the dead. They are sometimes asked explicitly about masturbation.

=== Piercings ===
The LDS Church has stated that, "Latter-day prophets strongly discourage the piercing of the body except for medical purposes. If girls or women desire to have their ears pierced, they are encouraged to wear only one pair of modest earrings."

=== Pornography ===
Latter-day Saints are counseled not to partake of any form of media that is obscene or pornographic, including media that depicts graphic representations of sex or violence.

=== Tattoos ===
The LDS Church has stated that, "Latter-day prophets strongly discourage the tattooing of the body. Those who disregard this counsel show a lack of respect for themselves and for God."

== See also ==
- Bloggernacle
- Christian culture
- Cultural Mormon
- List of Mormon family organizations
- List of Mormon folk beliefs
- Molly Mormon
- Mormon cosmology
- Mormon folklore
- Phrenology and the Latter Day Saint Movement
- Worship services of the Church of Jesus Christ of Latter-day Saints
