= Scot and Maurine Proctor =

Scot Facer Proctor and Maurine Jensen Proctor are American authors from the Church of the Latter Day Saints (LDS). The established the LDS-oriented website Meridian Magazine, and have published several works about Mormon history and beliefs. They have also published a revised edition of Lucy Mack Smith's history of Joseph Smith, which reintroduces material from Mack Smith's 1845 manuscript that was removed before its first publication.

== Biography ==
Maurine Proctor received her bachelor's degree from the University of Utah and her master's degree from Harvard University. She worked for the Chicago Sun-Times before she and her husband started their own magazine. She has also written a book entitled From Adams Rib to Women's Lib.

Scot Proctor is a professional photographer.

== Published works ==
The Proctors published a revised edition of Lucy Mack Smith's history of Joseph Smith, which reintroduces material from Mack Smith's 1845 manuscript that was removed before its first publication. This version is cited by scholars including Susan Easton Black and Craig J. Ostler. Their work is also cited in the bibliography to Scott R. Petersen's 2005 book Where Have All The Prophets Gone. They have also published a new edition of the Autobiography of Parley Parker Pratt.

The Proctors have compiled a book Light from the Dust which presents photos of areas they believe are similar scenes to where the events of the Book of Mormon took place. For this book the Proctors did on-site studies in Oman. Scholars such as Andrew H. Hedges though have quoted the Proctor's work, although Fred W. Nelson of the Neal A. Maxwell Institute felt that their work was "less reputable" in the area of Book of Mormon geography and archaeology than that of "reputable scholars" such as John Clark or John Sorenson.

The Proctors wrote The Gathering, Mormon Pioneers on the Trail to Zion. The Gathering was cited in the footnotes to Gregory A. Prince and William Robert Wright's book David O. McKay and the Rise of Modern Mormonism.

The Proctors have produced a DVD entitled Gordon B. Hinckley - Temple Builder.

Scott Proctor released Witness of the Light, a photographic book about Joseph Smith. The LDS Church has included his photos in their publications at times.

== Works ==
- Pratt, P.P.; Proctor, S.F.; Proctor, M.J. (2000). Autobiography of Parley P. Pratt: One of the Twelve Apostles of the Church of Jesus Christ of Latter-day Saints, Embracing His Life, Ministry and Travels, with Extracts, in Prose and Verse, from His Miscellaneous Writings. Deseret Book Company. ISBN 978-1-57345-862-7.
- Smith, L.; Proctor, S.F.; Proctor, M.J. (1996). The Revised and Enhanced History of Joseph Smith by His Mother. Bookcraft. ISBN 978-1-57008-267-2.
- Proctor, M.J.; Proctor, S.F. (1996). The Gathering: Mormon Pioneers on the Trail to Zion. Deseret Book. ISBN 978-1-57345-087-4.
- Proctor, M.J.; Proctor, S.F. (1998). Charting a New Millennium: The Latter-Day Saints in the Coming Century. Aspen Books. ISBN 978-1-56236-236-2.
- Proctor, S.F.; Proctor, M.J. (1993). Light from the Dust: A Photographic Exploration Into the Ancient World of the Book of Mormon. Deseret. ISBN 978-0-87579-680-2.
- Proctor, M.J.; Proctor, S.F. (1992). Source of the Light: A Witness and Testimony of Jesus Christ, the Savior and Redeemer of All. Deseret Book Company. ISBN 978-0-87579-648-2.
- Proctor, S.F. (1991). Witness of the Light: A Photographic Journey in the Footsteps of the American Prophet Joseph Smith. Deseret Book Company. ISBN 978-0-87579-389-4.

== See also ==
- Bloggernacle
- Culture of The Church of Jesus Christ of Latter-day Saints
