= Tigert =

Tigert may refer to:

== People with the surname ==
- John James Tigert III (1856-1906), American Methodist Bishop
- John James Tigert IV (1882–1965), American academic administrator
- Frank Tigert and Jesse Tigert, two men from Estill Springs, Tennessee shot by Jim McIlherron, leading to his lynching in 1918

== Location ==
- Tigert Hall, building in Florida
