= Cooper School =

Cooper or Coopers School may refer to:

== United Kingdom ==
- Cooper School, Bicester, Oxfordshire, England
- Orion Coopers School, Chislehurst, Kent, England
- Astley Cooper School, a 11–18 comprehensive school on the edge of Hemel Hempstead in Hertfordshire, England
- Sir Henry Cooper School, a former coeducational, secondary school in Kingston upon Hull, England

== United States ==
- Cooper Medical School of Rowan University, Camden, New Jersey
- Cooper School (Mebane, North Carolina), a historic one-room school building for African-American students on the National Register of Historic Places
- Cooper School of Art, a former private art college in Cleveland, Ohio
- Frank B. Cooper School, Seattle, Washington, an elementary school, on the National Register of Historic Places
- The John Cooper School an independent, college-preparatory, nonsectarian, co-educational day school in The Woodlands, Texas
- Cooper High School (disambiguation)
- Cooper Middle School (disambiguation)

== See also ==
- Cooper Union for the Advancement of Science and Art, or Cooper Institute, New York City, New York
- William John Cooper Academy, a middle school in Fresno, California
- Neva King Cooper Educational Center, Homestead, Florida
- Coopers' Company and Coborn School, Upminster, London Borough of Havering, England
