= Sterling M. McMurrin =

American theologian

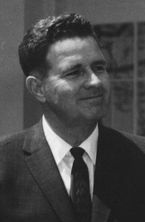

United States Commissioner of Education
- In office February 3, 1961 – September 8, 1962
- President: John F. Kennedy
- Preceded by: Lawrence Derthick
- Succeeded by: Francis Keppel

Personal details
- Born: Sterling Moss McMurrin; January 12, 1914 Woods Cross, Utah, U.S.
- Died: April 6, 1996 (aged 82) St. George, Utah, U.S.
- Education: University of California, Los Angeles (BA); University of Utah (MA); University of Southern California (PhD)

Sterling Moss McMurrin (January 12, 1914 – April 6, 1996) was a liberal Mormon theologian and Philosophy professor at the University of Utah. He served as United States Commissioner of Education in the administration of President John F. Kennedy.

== Biography ==
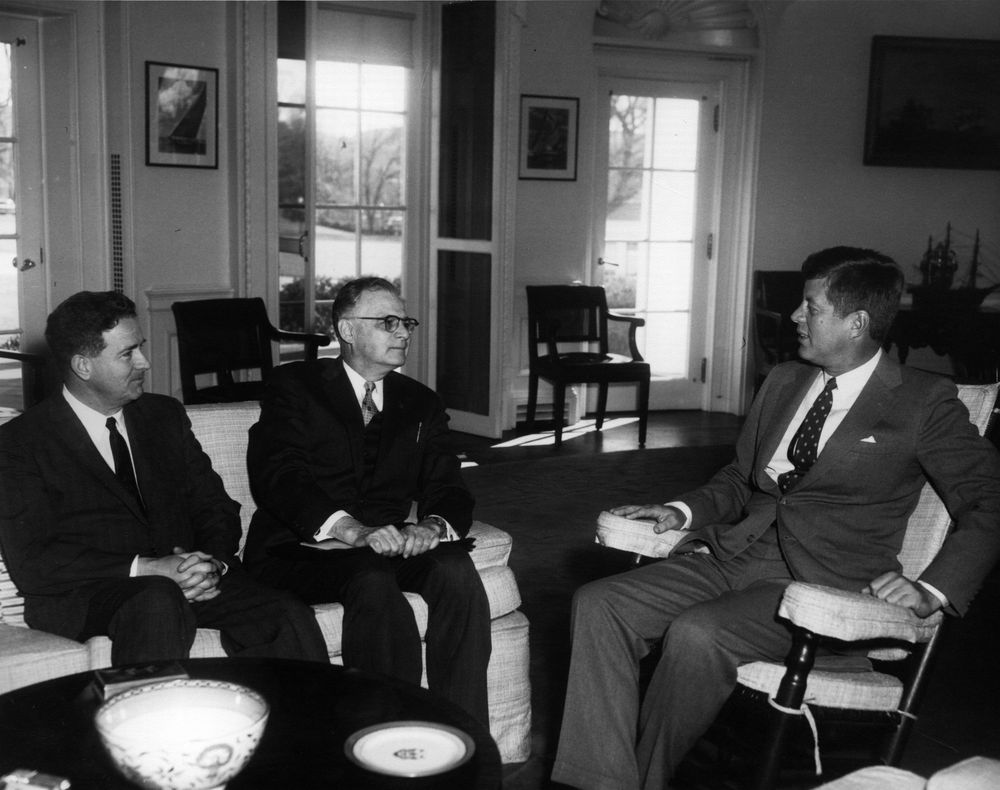
McMurrin (left) with Executive Secretary of the National Education Association William G. Carr (center) and President Kennedy, 1962

Born in Woods Cross, Utah, McMurrin's family moved to Los Angeles, California in the 1920s while he was at a young age. There he attended high school and the University of California at Los Angeles (UCLA), but he gained his A.B. in history and M.A. in philosophy from the University of Utah. Returning to California for doctoral studies, the University of Southern California awarded him a Ph.D. in philosophy in 1946. McMurrin also did postdoctoral studies at Columbia University, Princeton University, and Union Theological Seminary. For a time McMurrin worked for the LDS Church Educational System, first as a seminary teacher in 1937, then a teacher at Arizona State University, and Institute of Religion director at the University of Arizona.

Regarding his religion, McMurrin argued that the LDS Church concealed parts of its history and had been declining in intellectual freedom. He believed that an honest study of religion would erode faith, and he personally did not believe in the historicity of the Book of Mormon. However, he remained devoted to Mormonism, despite his lack of faith and criticism from more "orthodox" church members. In the early 1950s, Joseph Fielding Smith and Harold B. Lee believed McMurrin should be excommunicated. David O. McKay met with McMurrin and agreed to testify on McMurrin's behalf, but the apostles did not pursue the excommunication. Joseph Fielding Smith suggested again that McMurrin be excommunicated in 1965, but McKay declined to take action.

In McMurrin's noted career, he worked with universities, large corporations, foundations, and governmental agencies, as a teacher, an administrator, and an advisor.

== Works ==
- McMurrin, Sterling M. (1937), A Critical Exposition of the Epistemological Function of Faith in the Philosophy of Augustine, Anselm and Aquinas, [M.A. thesis], Department of Philosophy, University of Utah, OCLC 44714222
- —— (1946), Positivism and the Logical Meaning of Normative Value Judgments, [Ph.D. thesis], University of Southern California, OCLC 61117695
- —— (1954), The Patterns of Our Religious Faiths, Bulletin of the University of Utah, vol. 45, University of Utah, Extension Division, OCLC 18556306
- Fuller, B.A.G.; McMurrin, Sterling M. (1955), A History of Philosophy (3rd ed.), New York: Holt, OCLC 181576
- McMurrin, Sterling M.; Branch, C.H. Hardin (1956), Is There Freedom of the Will?, Salt Lake City: University of Utah, OCLC 57417311
- —— (1959), The Philosophical Foundations of Mormon Theology, Salt Lake City: University of Utah Press, OCLC 6132757
- —— (1965), The Theological Foundations of the Mormon Religion, Salt Lake City: University of Utah Press, OCLC 1636293
- —— (1982), Religion, Reason, and Truth: Historical Essays in the Philosophy of Religion, Salt Lake City: University of Utah Press, ISBN 0874802032
- —— (1992), The Tanner Lectures on Human Values: A History of the Early Years, Salt Lake City: Trustees of The Tanner Lectures on Human Values, ISBN 0874804191
- Tanner, Obert C.; Rogers, Lewis M.; McMurrin, Sterling M. (1990), Toward Understanding the New Testament, Salt Lake City: Signature Books, ISBN 0-941214-76-1
- ——; Newell, L. Jackson (1996), Matters of Conscience: Conversations with Sterling M. McMurrin on Philosophy, Education, and Religion, Salt Lake City: Signature Books, ISBN 1-56085-087-6
- —— (2004), Sterling M. McMurrin Lectures on Religion and Culture, Salt Lake City: Obert C. and Grace A. Tanner Humanities Center, ISBN 978-0-9742112-0-6

=== Edited volumes ===
- Jarrett, James L.; McMurrin, Sterling M., eds. (1954), Contemporary Philosophy, a Book of Readings, New York: Holt, OCLC 1490475
- McMurrin, Sterling M., ed. (1971), The Conditions for Educational Equality, New York: Committee for Economic Development, ISBN 0669745006
- ——, ed. (1980–1988), The Tanner Lectures on Human Values, [Volumes 1-8], Salt Lake City and Cambridge: University of Utah Press and Cambridge University Press, OCLC 781402973
- ——, ed. (1983), Values at War: Selected Tanner Lectures on the Nuclear Crisis, Salt Lake City: University of Utah Press, ISBN 0874802261
- ——, ed. (1987), Liberty, Equality, and Law: Selected Tanner Lectures on Moral Philosophy, Salt Lake City: University of Utah Press, ISBN 0874802717

=== Chapters and articles ===
- McMurrin, Sterling M. (Summer 1966), "On Mormon Theology", Dialogue, 1 (2): 135–40
- —— (Winter 1967), "Brigham H. Roberts: Notes on a Mormon Philosopher-Historian", Dialogue, 2 (4): 141–49
- —— (Summer 1979), "A Note on the 1963 Civil Rights Statement", Dialogue, 12 (2): 60–63
- —— (December 1979), "Problems in Universalizing Mormonism", Sunstone, 4 (5–6): 9–17
- —— (Spring 1981), "A New Climate of Liberation: A Tribute to Fawn McKay Brodie, 1915-1981", Dialogue, 14 (1): 73–76
- —— (March–April 1982) [1955], "Religion and the Denial of History", Sunstone, 7 (2): 46–49
- —— (1985), "Brigham H. Roberts: A Biographical Essay", in Madsen, Brigham D. (ed.), Studies of the Book of Mormon, Urbana: University of Illinois Press, pp. xiii–xxxi, ISBN 0252010434
- —— (1990), "B. H. Roberts: Historian and Theologian", in Bergera, Gary James (ed.), The Autobiography of B. H. Roberts, Salt Lake City: Signature Books, pp. vii–xiv, ISBN 1-56085-005-1
- —— (March 1993), "Some Distinguishing Characteristics of Mormon Philosophy", Sunstone (90): 35–46
- —— (Fall 1993), "Remembering B. H. Roberts", Dialogue, 26 (3): 73–76
- —— (February 1994), "In Memoriam: Obert C. Tanner, Symbol of Freedom", Sunstone (64): 13–15

== Sources ==
- Blankly, Thomas A. (December 1985), "The Swearing Elders: The First Generation of Mormon Intellectuals", Sunstone, 10 (9): 8–13
- Madsen, Brigham D. (1998), Against the Grain: Memoirs of a Western Historian, Salt Lake City: Signature Books, ISBN 1-56085-113-9
- Madsen, Brigham D. (2002), "Sterling M. McMurrin: A Heretic but Not an Apostate", in Sillito, John R.; Staker, Susan (eds.), Mormon Mavericks: Essays on Dissenters, Salt Lake City: Signature Books, pp. 285–303, ISBN 1-56085-154-6
- McMurrin, Sterling M.; Newell, L. Jackson (1996), Matters of Conscience: Conversations with Sterling M. McMurrin on Philosophy, Education, and Religion, Salt Lake City: Signature Books, ISBN 1-56085-087-6
- McMurrin, Sterling M.; Ostler, Blake T. (Spring 1984), "An Interview with Sterling M. McMurrin" (PDF), Dialogue, 17 (1): 18–43
- Newell, L. Jackson (Spring 1995), "Sterling Moss McMurrin: A Philopopher in Action", Dialogue, 28 (1): 1–17
- Newell, L. Jackson (September 1996), "Remembering Sterling McMurrin", Sunstone (103): 10–11
- Stack, Peggy Fletcher (February 22, 1997), "McMurrin Differed in Gentler Times", The Salt Lake Tribune, NewsBank Archive Article ID: 100F802E92116568
- Prince, Gregory A. (Winter 2000), "David O. McKay and the "Twin Sisters": Free Agency and Tolerance", Dialogue, 33 (4): 1–13
- Prince, Gregory A. (2005), David O. McKay and the Rise of Modern Mormonism, Salt Lake City: University of Utah Press, ISBN 978-0-87480-822-3

Political offices
Preceded by Lawrence Derthick	United States Commissioner of Education; 1961–1962	Succeeded by Francis Keppel
