= Princilla Smart Evans Morris =

- Born: 1950 (age 75–76)
- Education: Fisk University and Howard University
- Occupations: Executive director of The Center for Teaching and Learning and an associate chemistry professor at Fisk University
- Spouse: Bishop William Wesley Morris (2006-2016)

Princilla Violet Smart Evans Morris (born San Antonio, c. 1950) is the executive director of The Center for Teaching and Learning and an associate chemistry professor at Fisk University, and a graduate of the American Council on Education (ACE) Fellows Program. She's known for her long career in STEM and at a HBCU.

== Personal life ==
Evans was born to a US Air Force father, and the family moved to across the US and into England. She showed interest in the sciences while attending high school in England.

Evans married Bishop William Wesley Morris in 2006. Their marriage lasted until his death in 2016.

== Education ==
As a first generation college student, Evans chose Fisk University in her father's hometown, graduating with summa cum laude with a degree in biology in 1972. She moved to Howard University, earning her PhD in chemistry in 1977, based on her research on metallo-enzymes.

== Career ==
In 1983, Evans joined the faculty of her alma mater, Fisk University. She became the Director of Graduate Studies (a position she held for more than twenty years), then was named Dean of General Education and Graduate Studies in 2010. In 2013, she was serving as Executive Vice President and Provost. She continued on to her current positions as tenured Associate Professor of Chemistry and Executive Director of The Center for Teaching and Learning.

== Accolades ==
Evans was named a "Top Minority Women in Science and Engineering" by the Journal of National Technical Association (NTA) in 1996.

In 2003, Evans became an ACE Fellow, a preparatory program for a future executive position, which she attained.
