= Propero =

Educational website

- Company type: Subsidiary
- Industry: Education
- Founded: 1884
- Headquarters: New York City, New York, United States
- Products: Education
- Parent: Pearson
- Website: www.propero.org

Propero, an extension of Pearson Education, is a collection of self-paced, student-directed online courses offered to colleges and universities as an additional tool to help students complete their certificates or degrees. Propero courses are equipped with an eTextbook, downloadable audio podcasts, assessments, live tutoring, student coaching and live 24/7 technical support.

Since they are not an accredited institution, Pearson partners with the American Council on Education (ACE), which determined that Propero courses are recommended for college level credit at over 1,600 academic institutions in North America. Upon completion and passing of the Propero courses, online learners can apply for an ACE transcript to submit to their institution for credit.

== Academic courses ==
Propero provides courses in areas of Arts & Humanities, Communication Arts, Professional & Career, Science & Mathematics, Social & Behavioral Sciences. Along with access to live online tutoring, Propero provides access to live technical assistance through Pearson's Help Desk & Technical Support services.

== Recognition ==
Propero was recognized as a finalist at the 2014 CODie awards for the Best Postsecondary Personalized Learning Solution.
