= Leon R. Hartshorn =

Leon R. Hartshorn (January 16, 1929 – August 11, 2015) was a religion professor at Brigham Young University (BYU) and an author of many books. Most of his books were the collections of stories about leaders or members of the Church of Jesus Christ of Latter-day Saints (LDS Church). In the LDS Church, Hartshorn has been a bishop and the president of the Missouri St. Louis Mission.

== Biography ==
Hartshorn grew up in American Fork, Utah, and was a Mormon missionary in the LDS Church's Northern States Mission from 1949 to 1951. Hartshorn received his Ed.D. degree from the Stanford Graduate School of Education, with his dissertation entitled Mormon Education in the Bold Years.

Prior to joining the faculty of BYU, Hartshorn was an instructor for the Church Educational System and taught at the Church College of Hawaii, which has since been renamed Brigham Young University–Hawaii.

Hartshorn was a contributor of the article "Gift of Discernment" and others to the Encyclopedia of Mormonism and in 1996 was a co-editor with Dennis A. Wright and Craig J. Ostler of a book on the Doctrine and Covenants.

He died on August 11, 2015.

== Publications ==
Among books by Hartshorn are Joseph Smith: Prophet of the Restoration (1970), Put on the Armor of God, Memorable Christmas Stories, Remarkable Stories from the Lives of Latter-day Saint Women and a collection of stories of presidents, apostles and general authorities of the LDS Church. The Outstanding Stories by General Authorities eventually came to three volumes. Most of Hartshorn's collections of stories about church leaders were published in the 1970s, although some have been republished in the 21st century, often under slightly revised titles to make it evident they do not encompass the lives of apostles or general authorities called since the 1970s.
