= JaLynn Prince =

American humanitarian

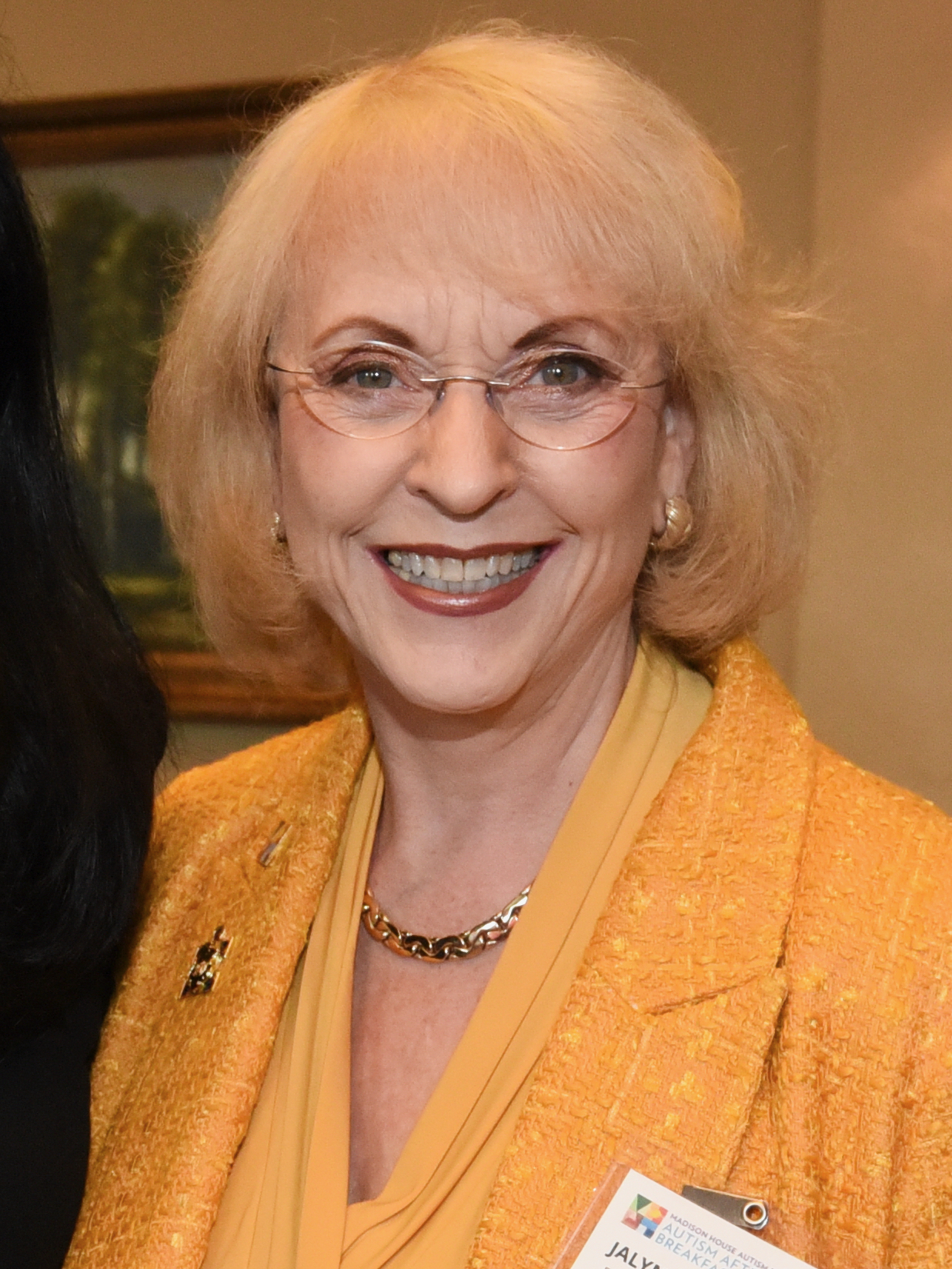
Prince in 2023

JaLynn Rasmussen Prince is an American humanitarian, photographer, businesswoman and the president and founder of Madison House Autism Foundation.

== Background ==
JaLynn Rasmussen was born and raised in Heber and Park City, Utah. She received her bachelor's degree from Brigham Young University, and has done graduate studies at American University in arts administration and at Wesley Theological Seminary in theology.

She is married to Dr. Gregory Prince, a Mormon historian and virologist noted for developing a treatment for Respiratory Syncytial Virus (RSV). They have three children. She has served as Chairperson of the Cultural Arts Committee of Washington D.C. Temple Visitors’ Center.

== Career ==
JaLynn Prince is founder and president of Madison House Autism Foundation. She and her husband are parents to Madison, after whom the foundation is named. The organization is dedicated to improving the lives of adults with autism and families by making people aware of the issues facing adults with autism throughout their lifespan.

JaLynn Prince is also founder and president of Times and Seasons, an arts management consulting firm emphasizing the arts, broadcasting, public policies, and public relations. She has served as an instructor at the Johns Hopkins University EverGreen Program. Prince's varied background also included stints as press secretary for a U.S. congressman, radio announcer, theater critic, and producer and director for television and theater. She has produced or directed more than 2000 arts performances, including gallery shows and performances. She was named on the Who's Who in Business 2005 list.

Prince is a respected Global Photographer and Speaker, having traveled to approximately 75 countries, and taken photographs in 42. Prince documented in still photography issues core to her humanitarian passions: children, education, women's improvement (specifically in regards to microfinance), health care, AIDS prevention and third world development. She studied under National Geographic photographer, Steve McCurry and joined him on a photographic expedition in Rajasthan, India. Her photography has been viewed at the United Nations, Manhattan's Jewish Museum in New York, and at universities across the country.

Prince has spent considerable time fundraising for children's hospitals, homeless shelters and arts organizations. She has served on the Operation Kids Advisory Board, Johns Hopkins School of Education Advisory Board, Southern Virginia University – National Advisory Council, National Philharmonic Board, and is the Founder and chairman of the board at the Madison House Foundation. Formerly, Prince has served on several boards including BlackRock Center for the Arts, Resource for Advancing Children's Health (REACH), Building Advisory Council at Wesley Theological Seminary, the Arts Gala Board for Montgomery College, Museum of Utah Arts & History board, the Washington Society of the Archaeological Institute of America, the Society of Biblical Literature, the American Academy of Religion, Brigham Young University Management Society, American Mothers Inc., and Rising Star Outreach, an organization dealing with issues surrounding the leprosy afflicted population in southern India.

Prince is a supporter of the Children's Arts Festival in Washington D.C. and sponsors "Salon" events in the D.C. area. Prince is professionally affiliated with the Royal Society of Medicine, Women of Washington, a board member at the Center for Reconciliation at Boston University, the Old Main Society of Utah State University, and the Junior League of Washington. Prince was named as one of "Maryland's Top 100 Women" by The Daily Record in both 2019 and 2022. Most recently she was appointed to a three-year term as a parent member of the Interagency Autism Coordinating Committee of the National Institute of Mental Health with the National Institutes of Health. In 2022, she was appointed to the Maryland Governor's Committee on Autism within the Governor's Office of Community Initiatives as a member of the Autism Stakeholders Advisory Group.

== American Mothers award ==
Prince's interest in autism rose to the national spotlight in 1999 when she was selected by the congressionally recognized American Mothers, Inc. and named National Young Mother of the Year for Maryland in 1999. She spent her tenure as a motivational speaker addressing issues facing individuals and families living with autism, addressing numerous national and international audiences. Prince also served four years on their national board. She was also awarded Woman of the Year from the Women's Office at Brigham Young University, as well as their Distinguished Alumni Service to Family award.

== Madison House Foundation ==
In 2009, Prince and her husband established the Madison House Foundation, named after their youngest son who is autistic, for the purpose of addressing the perplexing issues facing individuals with autism as they transition to adulthood, along with those issues facing family members, caregivers and society at large. Prince serves as President of the foundation.
