= Cooper High School =

Cooper High School may refer to:

- Cooper High School (Abilene, Texas)
- Cooper High School (Cooper, Texas)
- Cooper City High School, Florida
- Randall K. Cooper High School, Union, Kentucky
- Robbinsdale Cooper High School, New Hope, Minnesota

== See also ==
- Cooper School (disambiguation)
- Lubbock-Cooper Independent School District, Texas
