= Cooper Middle School =

Cooper Middle School may refer to:

- William John Cooper Academy, a middle school in Fresno, California
- James Fenimore Cooper Middle School, a school in Fairfax county
- Cooper Middle School (Georgia), a school in Austell, Georgia
- Cooper Middle School (Oklahoma City), a middle school in Oklahoma City, Oklahoma in the Putnam City School District.
- Cooper Middle School (Illinois)
