= Fountain E. Pitts =

- Born: July 4, 1808; Georgetown, Kentucky, U.S.
- Died: May 22, 1874 (aged 65); Anchorage, Kentucky, U.S.
- Resting place: Mount Olivet Cemetery
- Occupation: Clergyman
- Military career
- Allegiance: Confederate States of America (1861–1865)
- Branch: Confederate States Army; United States Army
- Service years: 1861–1865
- Rank: Chaplain, Colonel (CSA)

Fountain E. Pitts (July 4, 1808 – May 22, 1874) was an American Methodist minister and Confederate chaplain. He established Methodist missions in Brazil and Argentina in 1835–1836. During the American Civil War, he was a chaplain and colonel in the Confederate States Army, and he became known as the "Fighting Parson". After the war, he was the first pastor of the McKendree Church (later known as the West End United Methodist Church) in Nashville, Tennessee, U.S. He also grew poppies to make opium.

== Early life ==
Fountain E. Pitts was born on July 4, 1808, in Georgetown, Kentucky.

== Career ==
Pitts was ordained as a Methodist preacher in 1824. He was ordained as an elder by Bishop Joshua Soule in 1828. In 1835–1836, he went to Brazil and Argentina, where he established missionary posts that were manned by American men dispatched by the Methodist Church. Pitts owned at least one slave, named David, who died in 1855.

During the American Civil War of 1861–1865, Pitts joined the Confederate States Army, first as a chaplain in the 11th Tennessee regiment for six months, and later as a colonel in the 61st Tennessee regiment in the Great Smoky Mountains. He also fought "Federal gunboats for about five months at Vicksburg." He became known as "Fighting Parson."

Pitts was ordained as a Methodist deacon by Bishop B. T. Roberts in 1866. Shortly after, he was appointed by Bishop Holland Nimmons McTyeire as the first pastor of the West End Methodist Church in Nashville, Tennessee. It was then known as the McKendree Church. Pitts was described as "one of the most notable men in the Tennessee Conference" by The Clarksville Chronicle, and as "one of the pioneers of Southern Methodism" by The Pulaski Citizen.

In 1871–1872, alongside Dr. J. W. Morton, Pitts grew poppies to make opium.

== Personal life and death ==
Pitts resided on Gallatin Pike in Edgefield, now known as East Nashville, Tennessee.

Pitts died of pneumonia on May 22, 1874, in Anchorage, Kentucky near Louisville. His eyes were closed by John Berry McFerrin, who also conducted his funeral, and he was buried with Masonic honors in Mount Olivet Cemetery. In 1883, a monument was added to the top of his grave.

His portrait was painted by Washington Bogart Cooper, and it was installed in the art gallery of the West End United Methodist Church (then still known as the McKendree Church) in 1903.
