= George F. Zook =

American educator (1885–1951)

Fred Zook
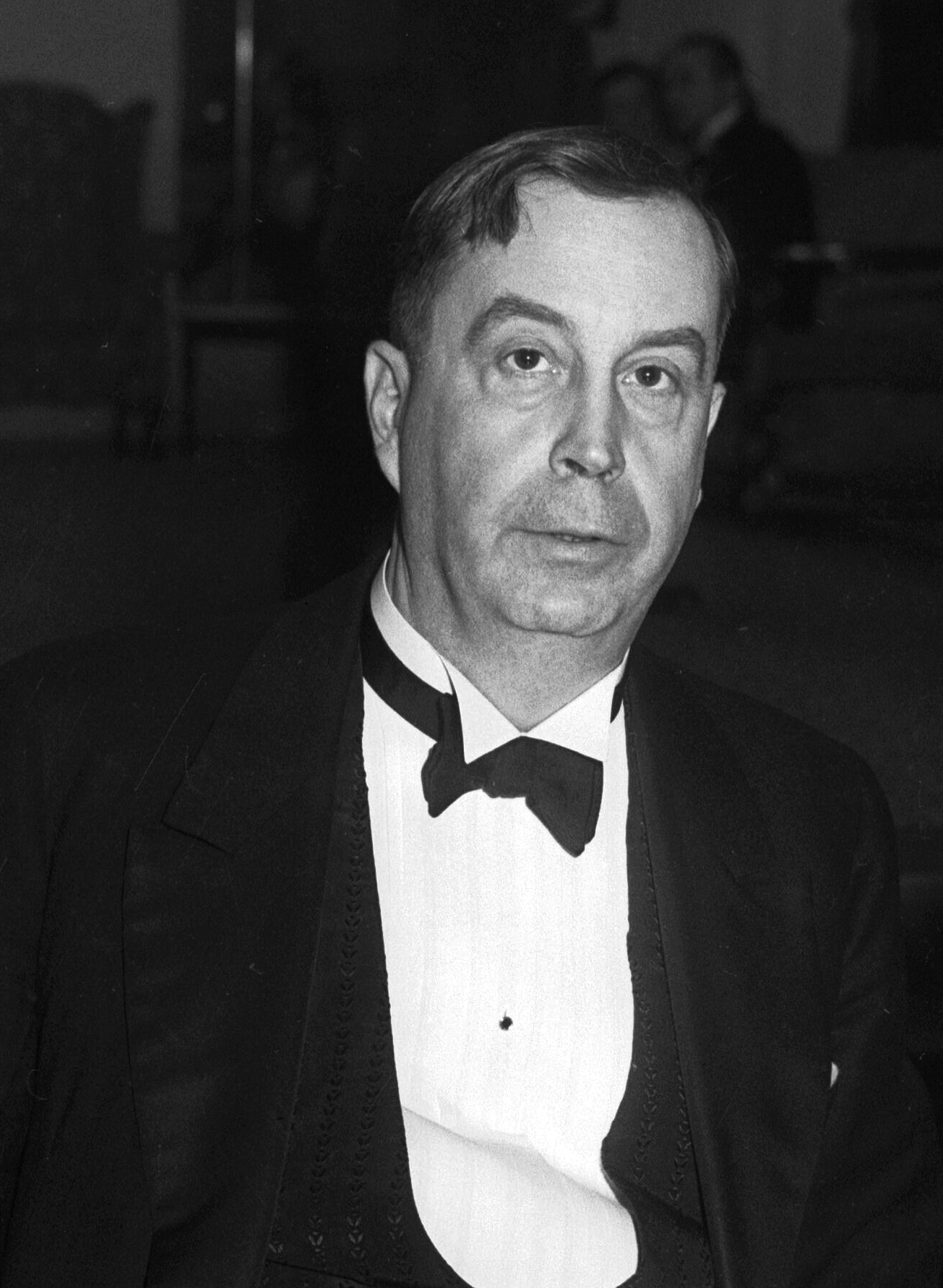

United States Commissioner of Education
- In office July 10, 1933 – July 1, 1934
- President: Franklin Roosevelt
- Preceded by: William Cooper
- Succeeded by: John Studebaker

Personal details
- Born: April 22, 1885 Fort Scott, Kansas, U.S.
- Died: August 17, 1951 (aged 66) Alexandria, Virginia, U.S.
- Education: University of Kansas, Lawrence (BA); Cornell University (MA, PhD)

George Frederick "Fred" Zook (April 22, 1885 – August 17, 1951) was an American educator who was President of the University of Akron, U.S. Commissioner of Education, and President of the American Council on Education.

== Life and career ==
Zook was born on April 22, 1885, on a farm near Fort Scott, Kansas, the son of Stephen Douglas Zook and Helen Follenius. He enrolled at the University of Kansas in 1902, funding his education by driving a hearse. After graduation he was a fellow at the University of Kansas, then an assistant at Cornell University, and a faculty member at Penn State University, where he advanced from instructor to full professor. His PhD The Company of Royal Adventurers Trading into Africa, was published in the Journal of Negro History in 1919. He subsequently specialised in modern European history. During World War I he worked in propaganda. In 1920 he began a 5-year stint as chief of the Division of Higher Education in the U. S. Bureau of Education.

In 1925 he became president of the University of Akron, serving there until 1933.

In July 1933 he assumed the position of Commissioner of Education under President Franklin D. Roosevelt. He resigned the following year, effective July 1, 1934, to become head of the American Council on Education (ACE).

Zook was president of the ACE from 1934 until retiring in 1950. During his tenure, the organization's membership grew from 269 to 1,093 member groups and became an important voice in education policy. Among the new policy initiatives it supported was the Fulbright Scholars program.

In 1946 President Harry Truman appointed Zook to chair a 28-member Presidential Commission on Higher Education that was given the charge of reexamining the U.S. system of higher education "in terms of its objectives, methods, and facilities; and in the light of the social role it has to play." In 1947 the commission produced a six-volume report entitled Higher Education for American Democracy that recommended changes to expand opportunities for postsecondary education.

George Zook was married to Susie Gant, a fellow student at Kansas. They were the parents of an adopted son. Zook died August 17, 1951, at age 66.

Political offices
Preceded by William Cooper	United States Commissioner of Education; 1933–1934	Succeeded by John Studebaker
