= William John Cooper =

American politician and educator (1882–1935)

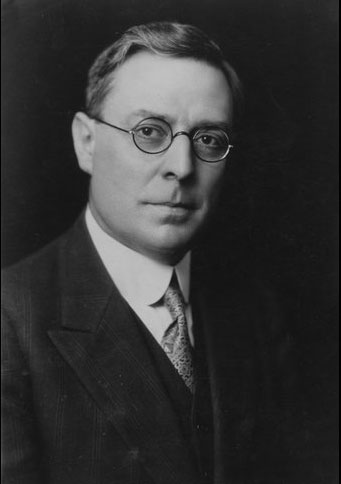

United States Commissioner of Education
- In office February 11, 1929 – July 10, 1933
- President: Calvin Coolidge; Herbert Hoover; Franklin Roosevelt
- Preceded by: John Tigert
- Succeeded by: Fred Zook

20th California State Superintendent of Public Instruction
- In office January 20, 1927 – February 11, 1929
- Governor: C.C. Young
- Preceded by: Will C. Wood
- Succeeded by: Vierling C. Kersey

Personal details
- Born: November 24, 1882 Sacramento, California, U.S.
- Died: September 19, 1935 (aged 52) Kearney, Nebraska, U.S.
- Party: Republican
- Education: University of California, Berkeley (BA, MA)

William John Cooper (November 24, 1882 – September 19, 1935) was an American educator who served as US Commissioner of Education from February 1929 to July 1933.

According to the New York Times: "His fundamental theory of education, which he often repeated, was that the ultimate goal of teaching should be, not how to make a living, but how to live. Nevertheless, he believed that the system of education in this country should break away from the older traditions of Europe and seek to express the cultural developments of the New World. In one of his last public addresses Dr. Cooper urged a complete reorganization of the education system in this country to bring the schools into closer harmony with modern conditions."

== Background ==
Cooper was the son of William James Cooper, who immigrated to the US from Sydney, Australia, and Belle Stanley (Leary) Cooper. Miss Leary was from San Francisco. They were married on February 22, 1882, in Sacramento, California, where William John was born. William James Cooper was a house painter and moved the family to Cottonwood, California, near Red Bluff where William John was then enrolled in high school. He graduated with honors as a member of the Class of 1902 at Red Bluff High School in Red Bluff, California.

He obtained his bachelor's (A.B. degree, Y Time 1906, dual major in Latin and history) and master's (M.A. degree, 1917, double major in education and history) degrees from the University of California, Berkeley

As a senior at Berkeley, William John Cooper worked as an assistant in the Department of History. He also taught summer session classes at the University of California in 1919, 1920, 1924, 1926, and 1927, and also a summer session class at the University of Oregon in 1923. He was a part-time instructor at Johns Hopkins University in the spring of 1932.

== Career ==
He began his career as a high school teacher of Latin and History in Stockton, California, from 1907 to 1910, then directed history teaching in Berkeley, California for four junior high schools and one senior high school, as head of the Department of History of Berkeley High School from 1910 to 1915. From 1915 to 1918 he supervised social studies instruction for Oakland public schools. He worked for the US War Department for eighth months from 1918 to 1919 in education and training. He served as the district superintendent of schools in Piedmont, California from 1918 to 1921, and the city superintendent of schools in Fresno from 1921 to 1926. According to Cooper's 1935 obituary in the Fresno Bee: "[Cooper] put into operation [in Fresno] a system which was considered one of the most efficient in the state. Fresno's public schools today are operating largely on the basis laid down by Cooper during his five-year term as superintendent. He instituted wide reform of the curriculum and directed an $1,800,000 school building program." He also taught as a part-time instructor at Fresno State Teachers College from 1923 to 1926.

He served as superintendent of schools in San Diego in 1926, and was then appointed by Governor Young to be California State Superintendent of Public Instruction in 1927. He served in that position until February 1929, when US President Calvin Coolidge appointed him to be the Eighth United States Commissioner of Education. His nomination was confirmed by the Senate during the fourth week of January, 1929. He was re-appointed by President Herbert Hoover and served in the first four months of the Franklin Roosevelt administration, serving in total from February 11, 1929, to July 10, 1933. At the time Cooper served, the US Commissioner of Education was not a cabinet-level position. Cooper reported to the United States Secretary of the Interior. Ray Lyman Wilbur was Secretary of the Interior during the Hoover administration. Wilbur served concurrently as President of Stanford University. It was possibly Wilbur who suggested to President-elect Hoover that Cooper be appointed to the Commissioner of Education position. Hoover was a graduate of Stanford University.

According to Cooper's biography listed in the Dictionary of American Biography: "As commissioner Cooper sponsored certain important investigations: a national survey of secondary education, a national survey of the education of teachers, and a national survey of school finance which was cut short by the depression. To the national office, he added the post of assistant commissioner and specialists in comparative education, tests and measurements, radio education, and the education of Negroes and exceptional children. He was the author of Economy in Education (1933) and published many papers in professional journals. During his commissionership, he was in demand as a speaker, delivering 229 written addresses and numerous others extemporaneously."

In 1933, Cooper resigned the position of US Commissioner of Education without giving a reason and became a professor at George Washington University in the District of Columbia. He also taught as a lecturer in education at the University of Michigan in the summer of 1935.

As explained by Frederik Ohles, et al.: "Cooper held that the time had come for education in the United States to end its dependence on European traditions and that it was necessary to create a new manner of education rooted in the culture of the New World. As the nation's commissioner of education, he called for consolidation of rural school districts and for greater guidance of schools by the states. He inaugurated surveys of educational practices in high schools nationwide, of teacher education, and of school finance."

== Honors ==
Although Cooper did not achieve an earned doctorate, he received nine honorary degrees during his career, including an honorary Doctor of Laws degree (LL.D.) from Whittier College in 1927, an honorary doctorate in education (Ed.D.) from the University of Southern California in 1928, and an honorary Doctor of Laws (LL.D.) degrees from Detroit City College in 1929, Birmingham Southern College in 1930, and Lafayette College in Easton, Pennsylvania in 1931. He received an honorary Doctor of Litt. from Rhode Island State College in 1931, an honorary Doctor of Science in Education by George Washington University in 1931, and an honorary Ph.D. from the New York State Teachers College also in 1931. He also received and honorary LL.D. from Dickinson College in 1932. As president of the senior class, he was selected to give a student address at the commencement ceremony at the University of California (Berkeley) in 1906. He served as a Regent of the University of California from 1927 to 1929.

In 1922, as Superintendent of Fresno City schools, Cooper worked on a plan to establish "intermediate schools," which would be attended by students of ability canvassed from the existing elementary schools (grades 1 to 6). Later, in 1959, a junior high school in Fresno, California, was named after him.

== Memberships ==
He was a member of the Federal Board for Vocational Education from 1930 to 1933, as well as the District of Columbia Commission on Licensure from 1930 to 1933. He was a member of the National Education Association (NEA) and also a member of the Department of Superintendence of the NEA. He was a member of the National Society for the Study of Education and also served as director and president of the Bay and Central sections of the California Teachers Association. He was a member of the A.A.A.S., as well as the American Academy of Political and Social Science, and was also a member of Kappa Phi Kappa, Phi Beta Kappa, Phi Delta Kappa and Alpha Sigma Phi. He was president of the Federal Schoolmen's Club in 1930-1931. Volumes 16 (for 1930-31) and 17 (for 1932-33) of Marquis' Who's Who in America (but not Volume 18 for 1934-35) list Cooper as being a member of the Cosmos and Torch clubs, as well as being a Republican. In 1911 he was a member of the American Historical Association. In 1929 Cooper oversaw the functioning of the Advisory Committee on Education by Radio, which was set up per the request of the Interior Secretary.

== Private life ==
He suffered a stroke while riding as a passenger in an automobile on September 10, 1935, and died nine days later on September 19, 1935, in Kearney, Nebraska, after having finished teaching a summer school course at the University of Michigan.

Cooper became engaged to Edna Curtis of Sacramento 10 days before the San Francisco earthquake of 1906, and they were married on Aug. 19, 1908. They had three children: William Curtis Cooper (1909–1987), Elizabeth Fales Cooper (1912–1988), and John Stanley Cooper (1918-2011).

Cooper's widow, Edna Cooper, died on Saturday, September 15, 1956, in Oakland, California, after an illness of seven weeks.

== Works and speeches ==
- Cooper, William John. 1906. Commencement address. University of California (Berkeley)
- Cooper, William John. 1915. Berkeley Public Schools—Courses in History. History Teacher Magazine, VI (Dec.), pp. 328–330. Google Books
- Cooper, William John. 1917. The teaching of Civics. Thesis (M.A.)--University of California (Berkeley).
- Cooper, William John. 1928. Commencement address. Polytechnic High School, Long Beach, California
- Cooper, William John. 1929. Address before the National Education Association's Department of Superintendence in Cleveland, Ohio (First official speech as US Commissioner of Education). Brief mention, with photo, in The Rotarian, May 1929, p. 19, Google Books. Brief mention: "Education: Commissioner Cooper," Time magazine, March 4, 1929
- Cooper, William John. 1929. Address to the American Library Association. Brief mention: National Library of Education webpage
- Cooper, William John. 1929. Some Advantages Expected to Result from Administering Secondary Education in Two Units of Four Years Each. The School Review (May, 1929), vol. 37, no. 5, pp. 335–346
- Cooper, William John. 1929. Address before the National Education Association (N.E.A.) conference in Atlanta, Georgia, July 1929. Brief mention: Time magazine, July 8, 1929.
- Cooper, William John. 1929. Some Opportunities for the Junior College. In: Proceedings of the Tenth Annual Meeting of the American Association of Junior Colleges, Atlantic City, New Jersey, November 19–20, 1929, pp. 87–94. Google Books
- Cooper, William John. 1929. Address. In: Proceedings of the twenty-fifth anniversary conference of the National Child Labor Committee, held in New York city December 16–17, 1929. New York, National Child Labor Committee, 1930
- Cooper, William John. 1930. Commencement address. Myrtilla Miner Teachers College, June 19, 1930.
- Cooper, William John. 1930. Commencement Address--"Is Teaching a Profession?". State Teachers College, Lock Haven, Pennsylvania, May 27, 1930
- Cooper, William John. 1930. Address before the National Congress of Parents and Teachers, Denver, Colorado. Brief mention in: Child Welfare--The PTA Magazine, Vol. 25, 1930, p. 50.
- Cooper, William John. 1930. Address before the second Regional Conference on Home Making, held at Ames, Iowa, November 1930. In: A symposium on home and family life in a changing civilization: addresses delivered at the second Regional Conference on Home Making, held at Ames, Iowa, November 10 and 11, 1930. Bulletin (United States. Office of Education), 1931, no. 5.
- Cooper, William John. 1930. New Responsibilities of Citizenship. Barnwell address given in Philadelphia
- Cooper, William John. 1931. "Education as a Vocation," address given at American University, March 5, 1931
- Cooper, William John. 1931. Address at the dedication of San Diego State College, May 1931. Brief mention: Google Books
- Cooper, William John. 1931. Commencement address. George Washington University, June 10, 1931
- Cooper, William John. 1931. Commencement address. American University. June 1, 1931
- McNeely, John; Ray Lyman Wilbur; and William John Cooper. 1932. Faculty inbreeding in land-grant colleges and universities, Washington DC: US Government Printing Office
- Cooper, William John. 1932. Commencement address. Sixty-eighth Commencement, Gallaudet College, Tuesday, June 7, 1932, Washington, District of Columbia. Excerpt: "You who of today go out of this college, go out into a world which is less hospitable to college graduates than usual."
- Betts, Gilbert L; Benjamin W Frazier; Guy C Gamble; William John Cooper. 1932. Selected bibliography on the education of teachers. United States. Office of education. Bulletin, 1933, no. 10, vol. I
- Cooper, William John. 1932. The Third Commission: International Justice and Education. World Affairs, Vol. 95, No. 1 (June 1932), p. 67
- Cooper, William John. 1932. "Military Training" (editorial), The Washington Post, Jul 1, 1932, p. 6
- Cooper, William John. 1932. Our Attitudes Toward Latin America Our Attitudes Toward Latin America, World Affairs, Vol. 95, No. 2 (September 1932), pp. 103–104
- Cooper, William John. 1932. Nationwide radio address, given at Alexandria, Virginia, December 14, 1932. Printed in: School Life, Vol. 18, No. 5.
- Cooper, William John. 1933. The Office of Education. The Scientific Monthly (February 1933), Vol. 36, No. 2, pp. 121–130
- Cooper, William John. 1933. Our Age: Some Implications for Education, The Phi Delta Kappan, Vol. 15, No. 6 (Apr., 1933), pp. 161–164, 175
- Evenden, E.S.; William John Cooper. 1933. Summary and interpretation, U.S. Office of Education. Bulletin, 1933, no. 10. vol. VI
- Cooper, William John. 1933. Economy in Education (School Economy Series, Ray Lyman Wilbur, General Editor). Stanford, California: Stanford University Press.
- Packard, Bertram E., Ben G. Graham, E. W. Newton, Ralph T. Fisher, R. J. Gorman, Bruce A. Findlay, Howard Pillsbury, W. R. Herstein, William John Cooper, Walter H. Maloney, Daisie L. Short, R. V. Jordan, Willard E. Givens, Richard M. Tobin, Lee H. Driver, Vierling Kersey. 1933. What Are the Practical Values of Music Education? What Are the Practical Values of Music Education? Music Supervisors' Journal, Vol. 19, No. 4 (Mar., 1933), pp. 57–60
- Cooper, William John. 1933. Address before the Woman's Club of Chevy Chase, January 21, 1933. Excerpt: "We must look at education not as a money return, but to be had as a means to live more fully."
- Cooper, William John. 1933. Address before the American Association of University Women, May 12, 1933.
- Cooper, William John. 1934. Address before the Takoma Park Home and School Association, April 24, 1934.
- Cooper, William John. 1934. Address before the Bethesda Chevy Chase Parent-Teacher Association, October 3, 1934.
- Cooper, William John. 1935. Commencement address. Harrisonburg State Teachers College, June 10, 1935.
- Cooper, William John. 1935. Commencement address. James Madison University, June 10, 1935, Harrisonburg, Virginia.

Political offices
Preceded by Will Wood	California Superintendent of Public Instruction; 1927–1929	Succeeded by Vierling Kersey
Preceded by John Tigert	United States Commissioner of Education; 1929–1933	Succeeded by Fred Zook
