= John Ward Studebaker =

John Studebaker
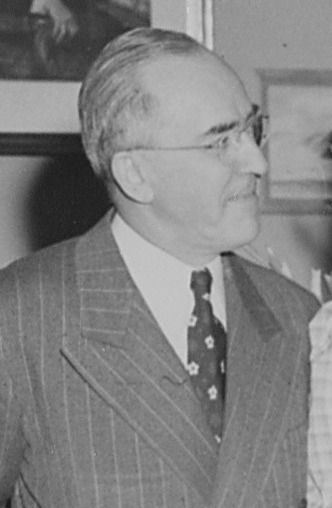
- Studebaker in 1947

United States Commissioner of Education
- In office July 1, 1934 – June 21, 1948
- President: Franklin Roosevelt; Harry Truman
- Preceded by: Fred Zook
- Succeeded by: Rall Grigsby (acting)

Personal details
- Born: June 10, 1887 McGregor, Iowa, U.S.
- Died: July 26, 1989 (aged 102) Walnut Creek, California, U.S.
- Education: Leander Clark College (BA); Columbia University (MA)

John Ward Studebaker (June 10, 1887 – July 26, 1989) served as U.S. Commissioner of Education from 1934 to 1948. He was also Chairman of the U.S. Radio Education Committee. His was the third-longest tenure of any education commissioner (after William Torrey Harris who served 1889-1906 and John Eaton who served 1870–86), and he devoted much of his time to children's literacy and arithmetic.

== Background ==
John Ward Studebaker was born on June 10, 1887, in Iowa and grew up in McGregor, Iowa. Although he was small in stature and had lost his right eye in an accident at the age of 12, he was a "star all-round high school and college athlete" who was the quarterback of his high school and college football teams, as well as playing baseball and basketball in college. He attended Leander Clark College in Toledo, Iowa (now part of Coe College), paying his way through school by working as a bricklayer.

== Career ==
After college, Studebaker served as principal of a public school, and in 1914 became assistant superintendent of schools in Des Moines, Iowa. During World War I he took a leave of absence from that position to become national director of the Junior Red Cross and to undertake graduate study at Columbia University, where he was awarded a master's degree in 1920. Returning to Des Moines, in 1920 he became the city's school superintendent. As superintendent, he started special education programs for children with disabilities and "slow learners."

Studebaker was first appointed Commissioner of Education by President Franklin D. Roosevelt in 1934. He served for the remainder of Roosevelt's presidency and continued in the position under President Harry Truman, resigning in 1948 with the explanation that he could no longer afford to serve in a position that paid only $10,000 annually.

Studebaker was best known, while Commissioner of Education, for his work on public forums. Believing that public discussion as civic education was the key to renewing democracy, he first ran a series of forums in Des Moines, Iowa, in 1932 – 1934, then instituted the Federal Forum Project, 1936 – 1941 until just before the outbreak of World War II. Studebaker published The American Way (1935) and Plain Talk (1936), both of which were influential with Depression-era educators.

Studebaker maintained his membership in the bricklayers' union long after becoming an educator. He was a member of the Methodist church, the Masons and Shriners, and Rotary International. Studebaker was also a member of the Peabody Awards Board of Jurors from 1940 to 1942. He died in 1989 in Walnut Creek, California, at age 102.

== Works ==
The Library of Congress online catalog lists 37 entries for Studebaker; his New York Times obituary cited two major works:

- The American Way: A Democracy at Work in the Des Moines Forums (1935)
- Plain Talk (1936))

Political offices
Preceded by Fred Zook	United States Commissioner of Education; 1934–1948	Succeeded by Rall Grigsby; Acting
