= L. Jackson Newell =

American historian and philosopher of education

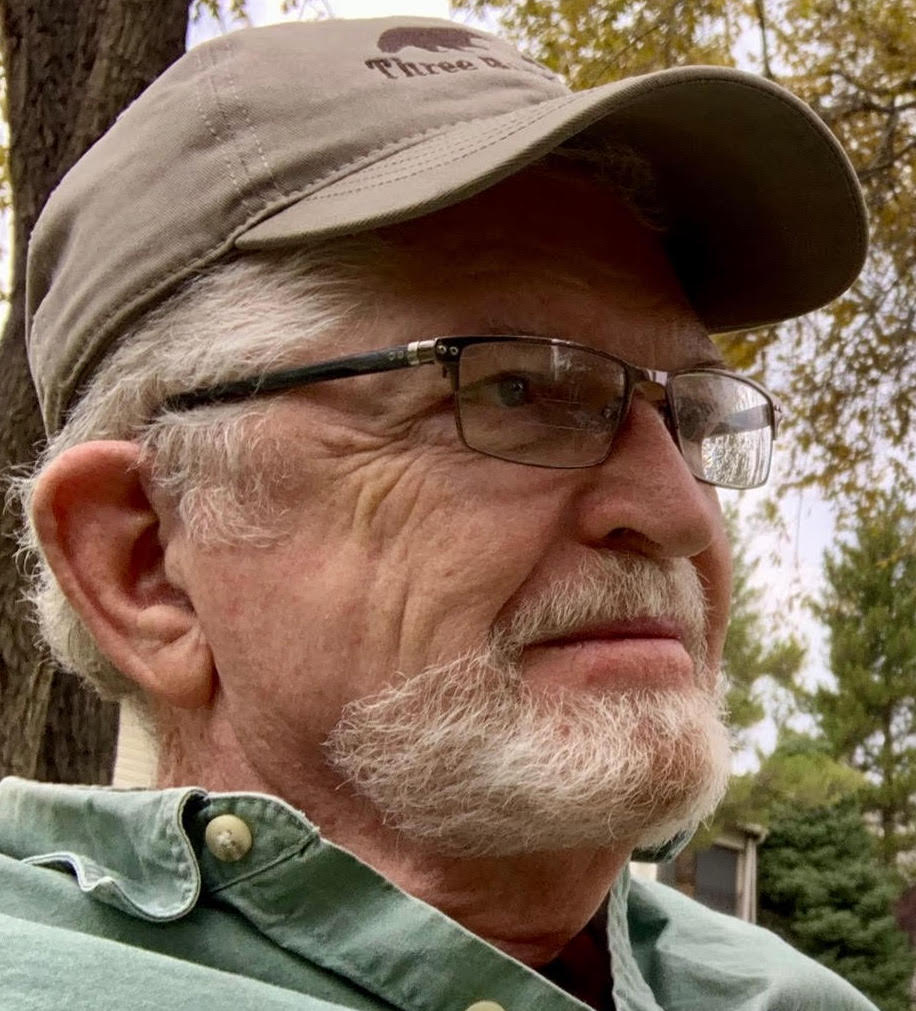
- Born: October 11, 1938 (age 87); Dayton, Ohio
- Education: Deep Springs College; Ohio State University (BA); Duke University (MA); Ohio State University (PhD)
- Occupations: Educator, author, college president
- Employer: University of Utah

L. Jackson Newell (born October 11, 1938) is an American historian and philosopher of higher education, specializing in the study and leadership of progressive colleges such as Antioch College, Berea College, and Deep Springs College. He has served as professor of educational leadership and dean of Liberal Education at the University of Utah, and as president of Deep Springs College.

== Early life ==
The youngest of three children, Newell was born in Dayton, Ohio, to Henrietta W. Newell, an educator and community activist and Leonard J. Newell, a physician in general practice. He studied liberal arts and sciences at Deep Springs College and the University of California, Davis, then finished his BA degree at Ohio State University in history. He spent his college summers as a mule packer and crew chief fighting forest fires at Glacier, Crater Lake, and Grand Canyon National Parks

== Professional education and career ==
Newell earned his MA degree at Duke University in American history with a divinity school minor. He taught for six years at Clemson University, Deep Springs College, and the University of New Hampshire before returning to Ohio State where he completed his PhD as the Thomas Holy Fellow focusing on the history and philosophy of higher education. He spent two years as a post-doctoral fellow at the University Council for Educational Administration.

In 1974, Newell joined the University of Utah faculty and shortly afterward was appointed dean of Liberal Education, a position he held for sixteen years.

Author or co-author of ten books and more than 100 articles, Newell collaborated early in his career on several studies with Roald F. Campbell, a pioneer in the study of educational leadership. Later, he collaborated with Sterling M. McMurrin, distinguished professor of philosophy and U.S. Commissioner of Education in the John F. Kennedy Administration. In Matters of Conscience with McMurrin, Newell launched his work as a biographer. During this period, he also published a major study of progressive institutions, Maverick Colleges: Fourteen Notable Experiments in American Undergraduate Education, and edited the refereed journal, The Review of Higher Education.

Newell accepted the presidency of Deep Springs College in 1995. During his tenure, he led an $18 million capital campaign, rebuilt the physical plant, and recharged the endowment. After nine years, he returned to teaching in the University of Utah's Honors College. Independently, he co-founded and co-taught the Venture Course in the Humanities for low-income adults in downtown Salt Lake City (a Clemente Course). He has since published three scholarly works: The Electric Edge of Academe: The Saga of Lucien L. Nunn and Deep Springs College, a biography of the early hydroelectric power entrepreneur and the college he founded; Hope, Heart, and the Humanities, about the Venture Course; and Conscience and Community.

As of 2022, Newell is professor emeritus at the University of Utah and President Emeritus of Deep Springs College.

== Personal life ==
Newell was married to author and artist Linda King Newell for more than fifty years, until her death in 2023. Their four children, Christine Louise, Jennifer Ellen, Eric Jackson, and Heather Ann, are all educators and public servants. Newell and his wife edited the independent scholarly journal entitled, Dialogue: A Journal of Mormon Thought and during the 1980s they published the work of D. Michael Quinn and championing independent scholarship and freedom of conscience within that religious culture.

Newell chronicled his withdrawal from the Church of Jesus Christ of Latter-day Saints in an autobiographical essay published in 2006. A second autobiographical essay in his "En Route" series, about his evolving philosophy of education, was published in Contemporary Philosophical Proposals for the University in 2018.

== Awards, recognition, and public service ==
Granted the special rank of university professor, Newell was also Utah's first CASE Professor of the Year. His teaching honors include designation as a Presidential Teaching Scholar and the Hatch Prize for Excellence in Teaching. The Association for General and Liberal Studies granted him the Joseph Katz Award for distinguished contributions to general and liberal studies, and the Association of the Study of Higher Education has recognized him with its Distinguished Service Award. In 2009 he became the ninth recipient of the Deep Springs Medal for a life of leadership and service consistent with the ideals of the college. He has served as a trustee (and board chair) of Deep Springs College, and as a board member for the Utah Humanities Council, the Bennion Center for Community Service, the Virgin River Land Preservation Society, and other nonprofits. He also served as a trustee of Westminster College (Utah) and is a senior advisor for Outer Coast College (AK), Thoreau College (WI), and Flagstaff College (AZ). In 2020, the University of Utah Honors College launched the annual L. Jackson Newell Lecture in the Liberal Arts and Sciences.
