= Francis Keppel =

American educator

United States Commissioner of Education
- In office December 10, 1962 – December 18, 1965
- President: John F. Kennedy; Lyndon Johnson
- Preceded by: Sterling McMurrin
- Succeeded by: Harold Howe

Personal details
- Born: April 16, 1916 New York City, New York, U.S.
- Died: February 19, 1990 (aged 73) Cambridge, Massachusetts, U.S.
- Education: Harvard University (BA)

Francis Keppel (April 16, 1916 – February 19, 1990) was an American educator. As U.S. Commissioner of Education (1962–1965) he was instrumental in developing the Elementary and Secondary Education Act of 1965 and in overseeing enforcement of the Civil Rights Act of 1964 in the schools. In 1966, he became head of the General Learning Corporation. Keppel later served on the New York City Board of Higher Education (1967–1971) and on Harvard's Board of Overseers (1967–1973). In 1974 he became founding chairman of the Lincoln Center Institute and director of the education policy program at the Aspen Institute.

== Background ==
Keppel was born in New York City and attended the Groton School in Massachusetts. He entered Harvard University in 1934 where he received a bachelor's degree in English literature in 1938. He spent the next year in Rome where he dabbled in sculpture and art studies at the American Academy in Rome. Returning to the States after the year and was named assistant dean of education (for freshmen) at Harvard University.

During World War II, Keppel was secretary of the Joint Army-Navy Committee on Welfare and Recreation in Washington, D.C. He later entered the U.S. Army's Information and Education Division. Following the war, Keppel returned to Harvard where was appointed assistant to the provost. Harvard President James Bryant Conant was so impressed with Keppel's magnetic personality and enthusiasm that he appointed him dean of the Harvard Graduate School of Education in 1948, though Keppel still had only an A.B. degree. At age 32, Keppel became the youngest Harvard dean in history.

During his fourteen years as dean, the School of Education more than quadrupled in size, applications increased tenfold, and the endowment swelled to over $9 million. An advocate for the progressive education movement, Keppel was especially known for testing reform ideas like "team teaching, programmed learning, curricular reform, and educational television ... he forged ties to other departments in the social sciences and humanities at Harvard. He was a widely respected leader nationally as well, serving on a number of important committees, task forces and councils." (Rury 2017). His practices set Harvard apart from other schools of education. Keppel was widely respected as a national leader and served on numerous committees, task forces, and councils during his tenure.

In 1962 President John F. Kennedy (Harvard Class of 1940) appointed Keppel Commissioner of Education, a post in which Keppel's leadership skills and social sensibilities made him highly influential. When the Department of Health, Education, and Welfare was created in 1965 Keppel became Assistant Secretary for Education. He was an aggressive advocate for civil rights and was the principal architect of the Elementary and Secondary School Act of 1965(ESEA). Title I of this act is devoted to providing funds for schools teaching poor or disadvantaged children. In consequence of a controversy in Chicago, Keppel resigned in 1966 and was replaced by Harold Howe II, who shared Keppel's reformist agenda. He is also credited with influencing the passage of the Higher Education Facilities Act, the Manpower Development and Training Act, and the Library Services Act. When President Lyndon B. Johnson elevated the Department of Health, Education, and Welfare to a cabinet-level office in 1965, Keppel became the assistant secretary of education. Keppel was featured on the cover of Time magazine on October 15, 1965.

ESEA greatly expanded federal influence on education. While its motives were praiseworthy, its transformations, supported by private foundations like the Ford Foundation and progressive reformers in leading schools of education, had a negative effect on school performance. The National Commission on Excellence in Education in 1983 found that SAT scores declined every year for 14 years from 1964, and that "nearly 40 percent of 17-year olds could not draw inferences from written materials." (Gardner 1983).

After leaving the federal government, Keppel became chief executive officer of the General Learning Corporation, a joint venture between General Electric and Time Inc. He later served as vice chair of the New York City Board of Higher Education and director of the Aspen Institute. He was a member of the American Academy of Arts and Sciences. In 1977, Keppel returned to Harvard University as a senior lecturer where he continued teaching until his death.

The Keppel award for the timely and accurate reporting of public library data to the Institute of Museum and Library Services was named in his honor.

Political offices
Preceded by Sterling McMurrin	United States Commissioner of Education; 1962–1965	Succeeded by Harold Howe
Awards and achievements
Preceded by Fidel Castro	Cover of Time magazine October 15, 1965	Succeeded by Vietnam War
