= American Council on Education =

American nonprofit organization

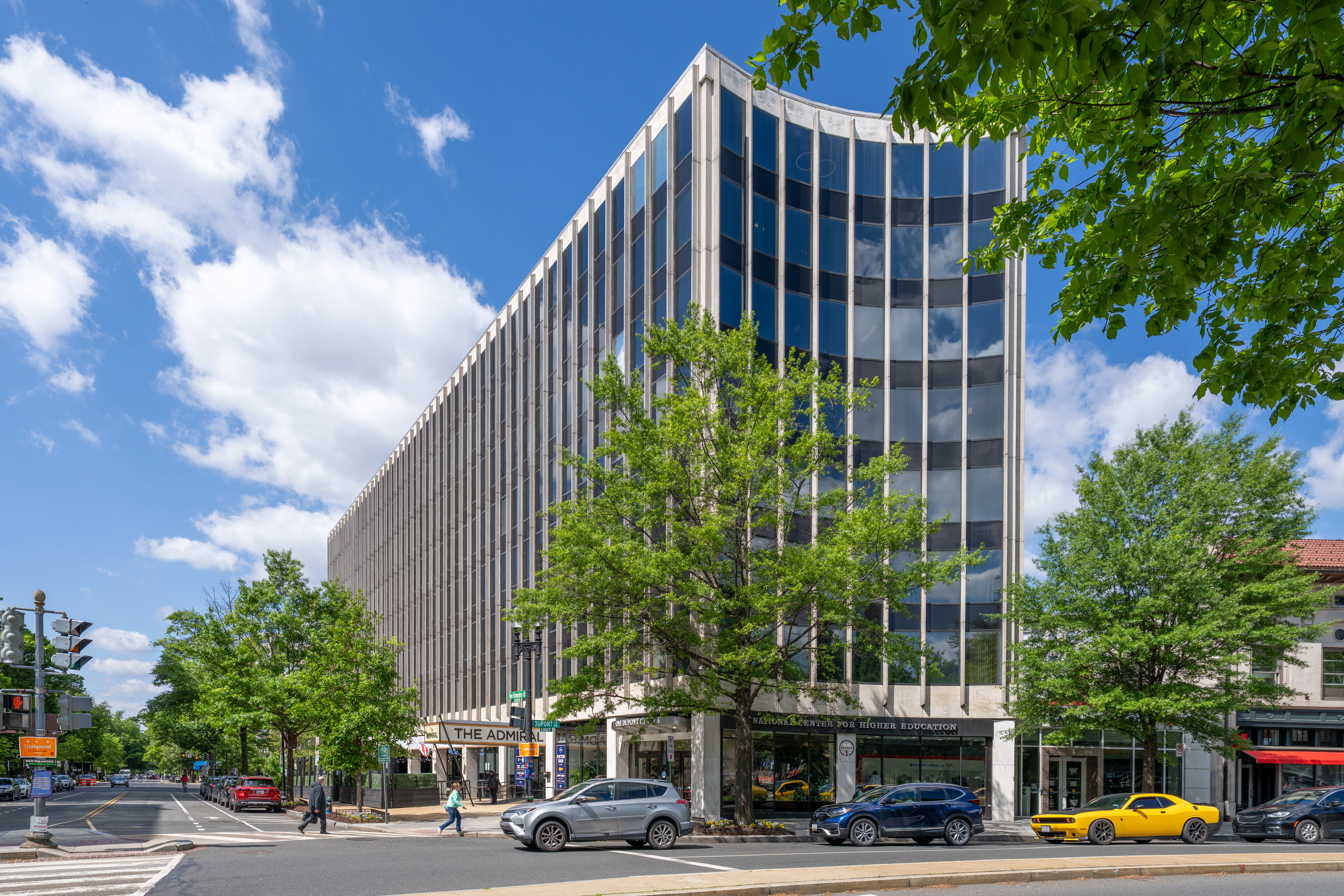
- Headquarters in Washington, D.C.
- Established: 1918; 108 years ago
- Type: Education policy nonprofit
- Tax ID no.: 53-0196573
- Legal status: 501(c)(3)
- Headquarters: 1 Dupont Circle, NW
- Coordinates: 38.9090°N 77.0442°W
- President: Ted Mitchell
- Website: www.acenet.edu

The American Council on Education (ACE) is a nonprofit 501(c)(3) U.S. higher education association established in 1918. ACE's members are the leaders of approximately 1,400 accredited, degree-granting colleges and universities and higher education-related associations, organizations, and corporations. The organization, located in Washington, D.C., conducts public policy advocacy, research, and other initiatives related to key higher education issues and offers leadership development programs to its members and others in the higher education community.

== Leadership ==
Ted Mitchell became president of ACE on September 1, 2017, succeeding Molly Corbett Broad, who had retired. Prior to coming to ACE, Mitchell served as the U.S. Department of Education's under secretary in the Obama administration from 2014 to January 2017. He also served as president of Occidental College from 1999 to 2005.

== History ==
=== Founding through World War II (1918–1945) ===
Representatives from 14 higher education associations formed the Emergency Council on Education in 1918 in Washington, DC. They soon changed the name to the American Council on Education and appointed Donald J. Cowling, the head of the Association of American Colleges and president of Carleton College (MN), to be the first president.

After World War I ended on November 11, 1918, ACE redirected itself to more expansive peacetime roles. ACE President Samuel P. Capen reexamined the missions, objectives, and processes of various institutions and helped spearhead a standardized, professional evaluation and accreditation system for institutions of higher learning in the United States. ACE assisted in drafting and adopting criteria that reflected the basic standards of a sound postsecondary education and developed peer evaluation procedures to ensure an institution's academic quality. In 1920, the Council published the first official listing of accredited higher education institutions.

In 1920, ACE established the Committee on the Training of Women for Professional Service to raise the status of working women to professional levels. The committee published its research of women in the workplace in The Educational Record in 1922. In 1927, ACE became the first educational organization to promote standard measures of achievement and potential through psychological exams for high school students and college freshmen. The Council published American Universities and Colleges in 1928, which offered information to students, parents, advisors, and educators on all accredited colleges and universities that offered a baccalaureate degree.

Following the stock market crash in 1929, the 1930s saw decreased education options and labor markets. While the number of high school-age students increased by 2 million between 1930 and 1940, young people had fewer opportunities than ever before. In 1935, ACE organized the American Youth Commission to address the plight of millions of school-age adolescents.

In 1938, ACE began studying the effects of racism on black children in the United States and published a series of reports on equal opportunity in education, including Children of Bondage: The Personality Development of Negro Youth in the Urban South by Allison Davis and John Dollard (1940) and Growing Up in the Black Belt: Negro Youth in the Rural South by Charles Spurgeon Johnson (1941).

In 1942, the Council spearheaded the General Educational Development (GED) test, a series of standardized exams used to measure a service member's proficiency in science, mathematics, social studies, reading, and writing among those who did not complete high school. That same year, ACE also developed the Military Evaluations Program to accurately award college credit for various military courses and training. The Council also helped draft and then lobbied for the passage of the Servicemen's Readjustment Act of 1944, known as the GI Bill.

=== Post-war through civil rights era (1946–1975) ===
In 1946, President Harry Truman asked ACE President George F. Zook to chair the 28-member Presidential Commission on Higher Education charged with reexamining the United States' system of colleges and universities “in terms of its objectives, methods, and facilities; and in the light of the social role it has to play.” The Truman Commission, often called the Zook Commission, was the first time a U.S. president had asked for a national look at higher education, an area previously left to local and state governments.

Also in 1946, ACE worked to support the creation and passage of Senator J. William Fulbright’s scholarship program, intended to advance mutual understanding of U.S. democracy both at home and overseas. Later that year, at President Truman's urging, ACE helped establish the United Nations Educational, Scientific and Cultural Organization (UNESCO), which provides international exchange opportunities for American scholars and administrators.

In 1947, ACE, the Carnegie Foundation for the Advancement of Teaching, and the College Entrance Examination Board formed the Educational Testing Service (ETS) to streamline the educational assessment process.

In 1949, ACE released a survey of college admission practices titled On Getting Into College, which found widespread admission discrimination against black, Jewish, and Catholic students.

With the onset of the Cold War and the Korean War in 1951, ACE convened the Conference on Women in the Defense Decade. ACE then established the Commission on the Education of Women (CEW) to research and clarify issues related to women's higher education. Operating from 1953 to 1962, CEW issued two publications: How Fare American Women? in 1955 and The Span of a Woman's Life and Learning in 1960. Both challenged the traditional notion that a liberal arts or home economics track was sufficient for women pursuing a postsecondary degree.

In 1962, ACE formed the Committee on Equality of Educational Opportunity in the wake of issues that were raised during the integration of the University of Mississippi. Two years later, ACE established the Office of Urban Affairs, which evolved into the Office of Minorities in Higher Education. In 1964, U.S. President Lyndon Johnson asked ACE to assist in crafting language and policy for a piece of legislation to expand federal aid to all qualified students seeking higher education, which became the Higher Education Act of 1965.

The passage of Title IX in 1972 barring sex-based discrimination served as the impetus for ACE's creation of the Office of Women in Higher Education. The office was designed to help ACE's members interpret legislation, eliminate discriminatory practices, and increase women's participation at all levels of higher education—from students to professors to administrators.

=== End of the twentieth century (1976–2000) ===
ACE helped define higher education's response to Section 504 of the Rehabilitation Act of 1973, which prohibited discrimination against individuals with disabilities. For secondary education, this included discrimination in recruitment, testing, admissions, and treatment after admissions. To foster results after the legislation's delayed implementation in 1977, ACE conducted a national survey of college freshmen who self-identified as disabled and then recommended accommodations and services to its member institutions. In 2000, ACE created the Higher Education and the Handicapped Resource Center (HEATH) to serve as the national clearinghouse of information regarding technical assistance in disability access.

In 1977, ACE's Office of Women in Higher Education launched the National Identification Program for the Advancement of Women in Higher Education, known as ACE/NIP. Its objective was to identify talented women and enhance their visibility as leaders by holding national, state, and regional forums that addressed key leadership issues such as finance and ethics in education, the role of trustees, and importance of diversity to the educational mission.

In 1981, the Council created the Office of Minorities in Higher Education (OMHE) to help address the need for diversity in higher education.

In 1982, ACE published the first of its annual status reports on minorities in higher education; five years later, the Council created the Commission on Minority Participation in Education and American Life.

In 1986, ACE conducted a national study to determine who the leaders of colleges and universities leaders were, what paths they had taken to the office, and what trends were impacting their role. ACE published the results the following year in the first edition of its American College President Study.

ACE created the National Center for Academic Achievement and Transfer (NCAAT) in 1989, which identified factors affecting student transfers to four-year institutions. A series of NCAAT studies published through 1992 examined ways community college curriculums could improve content, structure, and portability to best facilitate students' pursuit of a four-year degree.

ACE initiated the College Is Possible campaign in 1998 to bring awareness to the variety of scholarships, low-interest loans, and grants available to students of all academic and financial backgrounds.

=== Twenty-first century (2001–present) ===
In an effort led by Dartmouth College's (NH) president James Wright, ACE assisted Senator Jim Webb (D-VA) in drafting the Post-9/11 Veterans Educational Assistance Act of 2008, which expanded higher education benefits to veterans of 9/11 military service and their immediate families. ACE also assisted Senator Daniel Akaka of Hawaii in drafting the Post-9/11 Veterans Educational Assistance Improvements Act of 2010, which amended and improved the 2008 legislation, including benefits for some National Guard service members.

With donations from private contributors, the Council began a seven-year effort in 2007 to provide academic support to more than 750 severely injured service members through a program called Severely Injured Military Veterans: Fulfilling Their Dreams (SIMV). SIMV provided support services to service members, veterans, and their family members during their recovery at Walter Reed National Military Medical Center in Bethesda, Maryland.

After implementing Solutions for Our Future, a three-year campaign about the importance of higher education in society, ACE worked with the Ad Council and the Lumina Foundation to create 2007's KnowHow2GO, a program designed to help low-income, first-generation middle school students prepare for college. In 2011, ACE launched the American College Application Campaign, a national initiative conducted state by state to assist low-income, first-generation high school seniors to complete and submit at least one college application. That same year, ACE helped convene the National Commission on Higher Education Attainment to improve college student retention and degree completion.

ACE has filed more than 200 amicus curiae (friend of the court) briefs over the years. Among them are submissions in 2003 to the U.S. Supreme Court on behalf of the University of Michigan in Grutter v. Bollinger, in 2013 and 2015 in the Court's two reviews of lower court rulings in Fisher v. University of Texas at Austin, and in 2022 to the Supreme Court regarding the Students for Fair Admissions (SFFA) v. Harvard and SFFA v. The University of North Carolina at Chapel Hill cases.

In 2013, ACE President Molly Corbett Broad, along with 15 other higher education leaders, was invited by a bipartisan group of U.S. senators to be a part of the Task Force on Federal Regulation of Higher Education. William E. Kirwan, then chancellor of the University System of Maryland, and Nicholas S. Zeppos, chancellor of Vanderbilt University, co-chaired the task force, while ACE was requested to provide staff support. The culminating report, Recalibrating Regulation of Colleges and Universities, was released in 2015.

The Carnegie Classification of Institutions of Higher Education moved to the ACE in March 2022.

== ACE presidents ==
- Donald J. Cowling (1918–1919)
- Samuel P. Capen (1919–1922)
- Charles Riborg Mann (1922–1934)
- George F. Zook (1934–1950)
- Arthur S. Adams (1951–1961)
- Logan Wilson (1961–1971)
- Roger W. Heyns (1972–1977)
- Jack W. Peltason (1977–1984)
- Robert A. Atwell (1984–1996)
- Stanley O. Ikenberry (1996–2001)
- David Ward (2001–2008)
- Seth Ace Anderson (2008)
- Molly Corbett Broad, first woman to lead the organization, (2008–2017)
- Ted Mitchell (2017–present)

== See also ==
- List of higher education associations and organizations in the United States
