= United States Commissioner of Education =

The Commissioner of Education was the title given to the head of the federal Office of Education, which was historically a unit within and originally assigned to the Department of the Interior in the United States. The position was created on March 2, 1867, when an act to establish the Office of Education took effect under the influence of the more radical Republican Party. They were influential mostly in the Northern states and New England, which were much more progressive in the fields of education and had already established many state departments of education. They also had a large number of public schools and systems in cities, towns and counties, both at the elementary (grammar) school and high school levels, in which the South had lagged behind.

The commissioner was the U.S. government's highest education official from after the Civil War and its reforming period of Reconstruction in 1867, until 1972, when the office of Assistant Secretary for Education was established within the independent Department of Health, Education and Welfare. The H.E.W. department had been earlier created as a cabinet-level department in April 1953, under President Harry Truman, continuing the previous advances created by the administration of Franklin D. Roosevelt and instigated under Dwight D. Eisenhower. Ultimately, the head of the federal government's nationwide educational efforts was reorganized with the separation and division of old H.E.W. into the new United States Department of Education in 1979 under President Jimmy Carter, with its own Cabinet-level position of the U.S. Secretary of Education.

== Responsibilities ==
The commissioner was responsible for:

- Formulating educational policy
- Administering the various functions of the Office of Education
- Coordinating educational activities at the national level

The commissioner also served as an ex officio member of the District of Columbia Commission on Licensure, the Board of Foreign Scholarships and served as the governmental representative on the U.S. National Commission for UNESCO (United Nations Educational, Scientific and Cultural Organization).

== History ==
The independent federal Office of Education was created on March 2, 1867. It became part of the U.S. Department of the Interior on July 1, 1889. The office (also known later as the Bureau of Education) was included in the Interior Department's Federal Security Agency when it was established on July 1, 1939. The office was moved into the new U.S. Department of Health, Education and Welfare in April 1953, after Presidents Franklin D. Roosevelt and Harry Truman, accomplished shortly after the inauguration of Dwight D. Eisenhower

In 1972, Public Law 92-318 provided the repeal of a part of the law which had created the office of Commissioner of Education. The repeal took effect on July 1, 1972. The Office of Education ceased to exist. Although the Assistant Secretary of Education then became the highest federal education position, the office of Commissioner of Education continued to exist within the new United States Department of Health, Education and Welfare until 1979, when the post was phased out due to the creation of the divided and reorganized new Department of Education which also was part of the President's Cabinet with its office of the U.S. Secretary of Education.

=== List of commissioners of education ===
Denotes acting capacity.

Image	Name	Start	End	President(s)
	Henry Barnard	March 11, 1867	March 15, 1870	Andrew Johnson (1865–1869)
	Henry Barnard	March 11, 1867	March 15, 1870	Ulysses S. Grant (1869–1877)
	John Eaton	March 16, 1870	August 5, 1886	Ulysses S. Grant (1869–1877)
	John Eaton	March 16, 1870	August 5, 1886	Rutherford B. Hayes (1877–1881)
	John Eaton	March 16, 1870	August 5, 1886	James A. Garfield (1881)
	John Eaton	March 16, 1870	August 5, 1886	Chester A. Arthur (1881–1885)
	John Eaton	March 16, 1870	August 5, 1886	Grover Cleveland (1885–1889)
	Nathaniel Dawson	August 6, 1886	September 3, 1889	Grover Cleveland (1885–1889)
	Nathaniel Dawson	August 6, 1886	September 3, 1889	Benjamin Harrison (1889–1893)
	William Harris	September 12, 1889	June 30, 1906	Benjamin Harrison (1889–1893)
	William Harris	September 12, 1889	June 30, 1906	Grover Cleveland (1893–1897)
	William Harris	September 12, 1889	June 30, 1906	William McKinley (1897–1901)
	William Harris	September 12, 1889	June 30, 1906	Theodore Roosevelt (1901–1909)
	Elmer Brown	July 1, 1906	June 30, 1911	Theodore Roosevelt (1901–1909)
	Elmer Brown	July 1, 1906	June 30, 1911	William Howard Taft (1909–1913)
	Philander Claxton	July 1, 1911	June 2, 1921	William Howard Taft (1909–1913)
	Philander Claxton	July 1, 1911	June 2, 1921	Woodrow Wilson (1913–1921)
	John Tigert	June 2, 1921	September 1, 1928	Woodrow Wilson (1913–1921)
	John Tigert	June 2, 1921	September 1, 1928	Warren G. Harding (1921–1923)
	William Cooper	February 11, 1929	July 10, 1933	Warren G. Harding (1921–1923)
	William Cooper	February 11, 1929	July 10, 1933	Calvin Coolidge (1923–1929)
	William Cooper	February 11, 1929	July 10, 1933	Herbert Hoover (1929–1933)
	William Cooper	February 11, 1929	July 10, 1933	Franklin D. Roosevelt (1933–1945)
	Fred Zook	July 10, 1933	July 1, 1934	Franklin D. Roosevelt (1933–1945)
	John Studebaker	July 1, 1934	June 21, 1948	Franklin D. Roosevelt (1933–1945)
	John Studebaker	July 1, 1934	June 21, 1948	Harry S. Truman (1945–1953)
	Rall Grigsby; Acting	June 21, 1948	March 18, 1949	Harry S. Truman (1945–1953)
	Earl McGrath	March 18, 1949	April 1953	Harry S. Truman (1945–1953)
	Earl McGrath	March 18, 1949	April 1953	Dwight D. Eisenhower (1953–1961)
	Lee Thurston	July 1, 1953	September 4, 1953	Dwight D. Eisenhower (1953–1961)
	Samuel Brownell	October 1953	September 1, 1956	Dwight D. Eisenhower (1953–1961)
	Lawrence Derthick	November 28, 1956	January 20, 1961	Dwight D. Eisenhower (1953–1961)
	Sterling McMurrin	February 3, 1961	September 8, 1962	John F. Kennedy (1961–1963)
	Francis Keppel	December 10, 1962	December 18, 1965	John F. Kennedy (1961–1963)
	Francis Keppel	December 10, 1962	December 18, 1965	Lyndon B. Johnson (1963–1969)
	Harold Howe	December 18, 1965	January 20, 1969	Lyndon B. Johnson (1963–1969)
	James Allen	May 5, 1969	June 10, 1970	Richard Nixon (1969–1974)
	Sidney Marland	December 1970	October 1972	Richard Nixon (1969–1974)
	John Ottina	July 1973	June 1974	Richard Nixon (1969–1974)
	Terrel Bell	June 1974	August 1, 1976	Richard Nixon (1969–1974)
	Terrel Bell	June 1974	August 1, 1976	Gerald Ford (1974–1977)
	Edward Aguirre	October 18, 1976	January 20, 1977	Gerald Ford (1974–1977)
	Ernest Boyer	March 31, 1977	June 30, 1979	Jimmy Carter (1977–1981)
	William Smith	January 4, 1980	May 4, 1980	Jimmy Carter (1977–1981)
