= Bob Wright (author) =

American political candidate and author

Chair of the Utah Republican Party
- In office 1977–1979

Personal details
- Born: William Robert Wright; May 20, 1935 Salt Lake City, Utah, U.S.
- Died: January 13, 2012 (aged 76) Salt Lake City, Utah, U.S.
- Party: Republican
- Children: 8, including Thomas Wright
- Education: University of Utah (BS, JD)

William Robert Wright (May 20, 1935 – January 13, 2012) was an American attorney, political candidate, and author.

== Early life and education ==
Wright was born in Salt Lake City, Utah, to Ralph Bassett Wright and Afton Middlemiss Wright. He graduated from East High School in 1953, and then served in the Swiss Austrian Mission of the LDS Church from 1955 to 1958. Returning home to the University of Utah, he was elected student body vice president and received a Bachelor of Science in Geology in 1960, and a J.D. in 1963.

== Career ==
Wright worked at the firm Jones, Waldo, Holbrook & McDonough in Salt Lake City for 29 years.. He later become a partner at Arent Fox in Washington, D.C., and then at Bryan Cave in Salt Lake City.

From 1977 to 1979, Wright was Chairman of the Utah Republican Party. He ran unsuccessfully as the GOP's candidate for Utah governor in the 1980 gubernatorial election against Scott M. Matheson. He was considered for President Ronald Reagan's judicial nomination to the United States Court of Appeals for the Tenth Circuit.

From 1989 to 1992, Wright served in the LDS Church as president of the Washington D.C. North Mission. There, he met Gregory Prince, a pathology researcher, and they began a ten-year collaboration to produce a biography of David O. McKay. The book drew from the Middlemiss papers and interviews conducted by Wright and Prince, and was published in 2005 as David O. McKay and the Rise of Modern Mormonism, winning multiple awards.

After retiring from full time legal work, Wright practiced law independently in Salt Lake City and Washington, D.C. He also served as chairman of the University of Utah's Institutional Council and as chairman of the Utah State School Board. Wright was also a lecturer and Fellow of the S.J. Quinney College of Law and held leadership positions with the Utah State Bar.

== Personal life ==
Wright married Janet Clark in the Salt Lake Temple in 1965. They lived in Salt Lake City and had one daughter and seven sons, including Thomas Wright, a real estate broker and one-time Chairman of the Utah Republican Party.

Wright died on January 13, 2012, after a 20-year struggle with Alzheimer's disease.

== Citations ==
- Prince, Gregory A.; Wright, Wm. Robert (2005). David O. McKay and the Rise of Modern Mormonism. University of Utah Press. ISBN 0-87480-822-7.

Party political offices
Preceded by Vernon B. Romney	Republican nominee for Governor of Utah; 1980	Succeeded by Norman H. Bangerter
