= Tigert Hall =

- U.S. Historic district – Contributing property
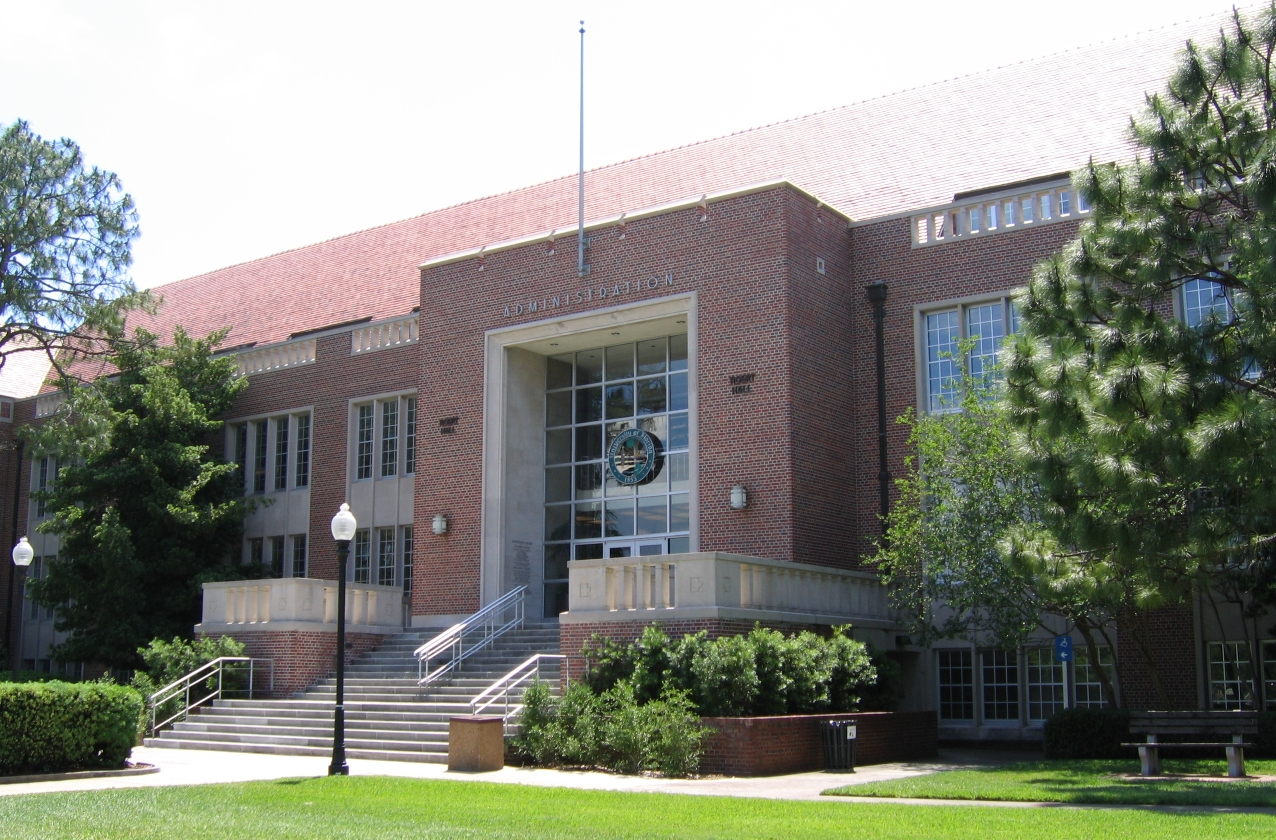
- Tigert Hall

- Location within Florida Location within the United States
- Location: Gainesville, Florida
- Coordinates: 29°38′58″N 82°20′24″W
- Built: 1949–1950
- Architect: Jefferson Hamilton
- Architectural style: Modified Collegiate Gothic

Tigert Hall, built in the late 1940s and early 1950s, is a historic administrative building located on the eastern edge of the University of Florida campus in Gainesville, Florida. It was designed by architect Jefferson Hamilton in a modified Collegiate Gothic style to function as the university's main administration building. In 1960, it was renamed for John J. Tigert, the university's third president, who served from 1928 to 1947. Tigert Hall faces Southwest Thirteenth Street (U.S. 441), one of the major public roads adjoining the university's campus.

Tigert Hall became a contributing property in the University of Florida Campus Historic District in 2008; the historic district had been previously added to the National Register of Historic Places on April 20, 1989.

== See also ==
- History of the University of Florida
- List of University of Florida buildings
- List of University of Florida presidents
- University of Florida Campus Historic District
