= William John Cooper Academy =

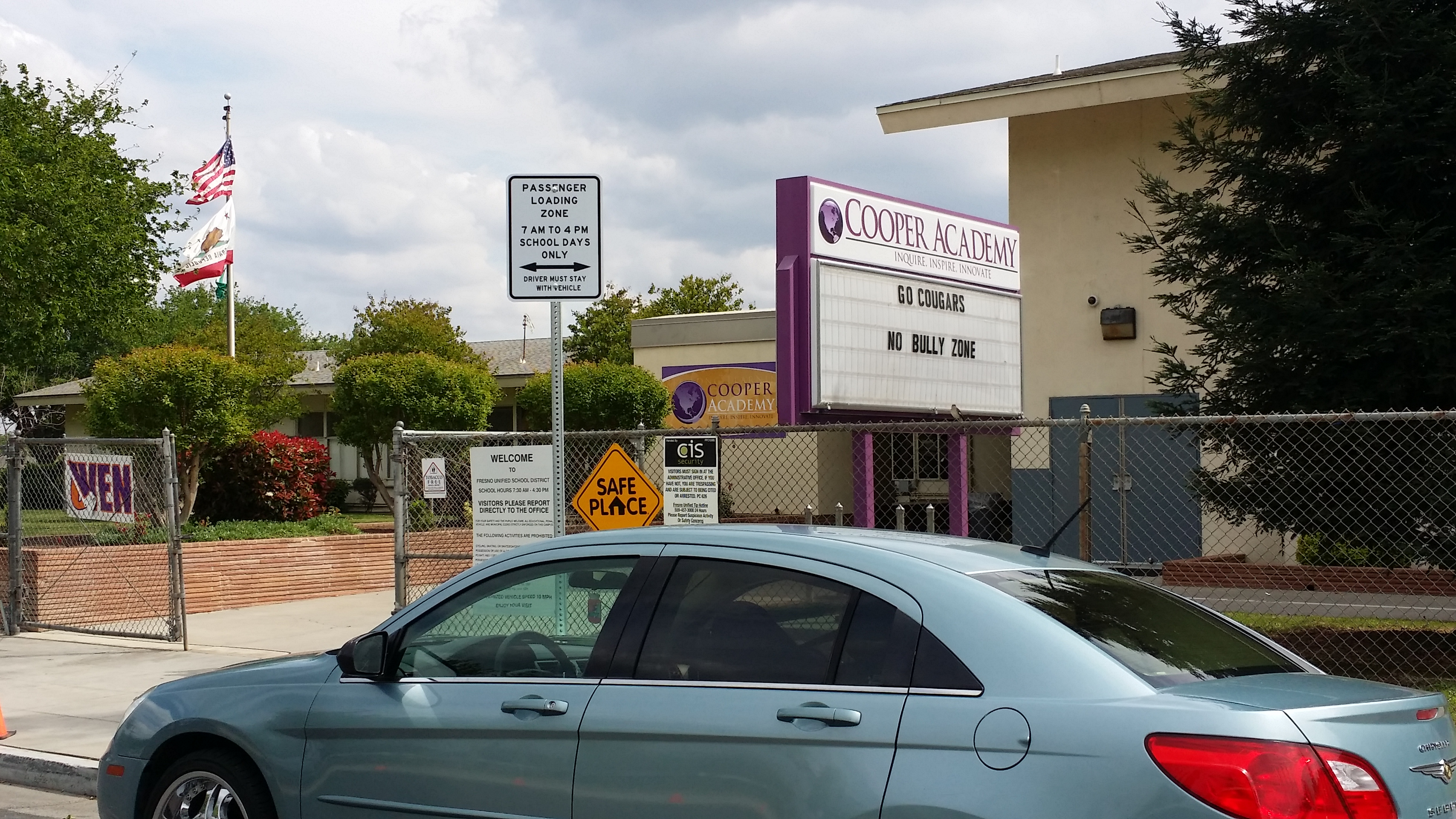

Location
- 2277 West Bellaire Way; Fresno, California 93705-1736; United States

Information
- School type: Public, middle school
- Motto: Inquire, Inspire, Innovate.
- Established: 1959
- Status: Open
- Authority: Fresno Unified School District
- Principal: Sandra Auble
- Teaching staff: 25.45 (FTE)
- Grades: 6-8
- Enrollment: 573 (2018-19)
- Student to teacher ratio: 22.51
- Mascot: Cougar
- Website: www.fresnounified.org/schools/cooper

William John Cooper Academy is a middle school in Fresno, California, operated by the Fresno Unified School District.

The school implements the International Baccalaureate Middle Years Program. The IB program was given to Cooper Middle School (the name of the school before it was Cooper Academy), since most students from Cooper Middle School would later on attend Fresno High School, a high school that implements the IB Diploma Program. During the 2012–2013 school year, there were about 430 students attending Cooper Academy.

The school was first approved to be built by the Fresno City Board of Education in November 1956 and opened as a junior high school (grades 7, 8 and 9) in the fall of 1959 with John Solo as the inaugural principal. In the fall of 1978, William John Cooper Junior High School officially became William John Cooper Middle School (grades 7 and 8), when Hamilton Junior High School was made into a new "freshman school," educating only ninth graders. The school is named for William John Cooper, a Californian, who served as United States Commissioner of Education under Presidents Coolidge, Hoover and Roosevelt from 1929 to 1933. In August 2012, Cooper Middle School became Cooper Academy, starting with the sixth and seventh grade levels only. In August 2013 the eighth grade level was added.

Author William Saroyan lived two blocks from the school from 1964 to 1981, sometimes interacting with students.

== Notable alumni ==
- Mark Scott (Class of 1964)
- Bill McEwen (Class of 1969)
- John Hoover (Class of 1977)
- Cliff Harris (Class of 2005)

== See also ==
- Fresno Unified's I.B. program move causes outrage with parents - February 27, 2012, www.abclocal.go.com
- Education in California
