= Higher Education for American Democracy =

Higher Education for American Democracy was a report to U.S. President Harry S. Truman on the condition of higher education in the United States. The commission to write this report was established on July 13, 1946, and it was chaired by George F. Zook.

The report is significant not only for its six-volume size but for the fact that it marks the first time in United States history that a President established a commission for the purposes of analyzing the country's system of education, a task typically left to the states as prescribed by the Tenth Amendment. Such Presidential commissions are, today, relatively common. See, for example, President Ronald Reagan's, A Nation at Risk, and President George W. Bush's, "A Test of Leadership," sometimes known as The Spellings Report.

The Truman Commission Report, as it is sometimes known, calls for several significant changes in postsecondary education, among them, the establishment of a network of public community colleges, which would be free of charge for "all youth who can profit from such education". The commission helped popularize the phrase "community college" in the late 1940s and helped shape the future of two-year degree institutions in the U.S. The report also calls for increased Federal spending in the form of "scholarships, fellowships, and general aid".
