= John J. Tigert =

American educator (1882–1965)

John Tigert
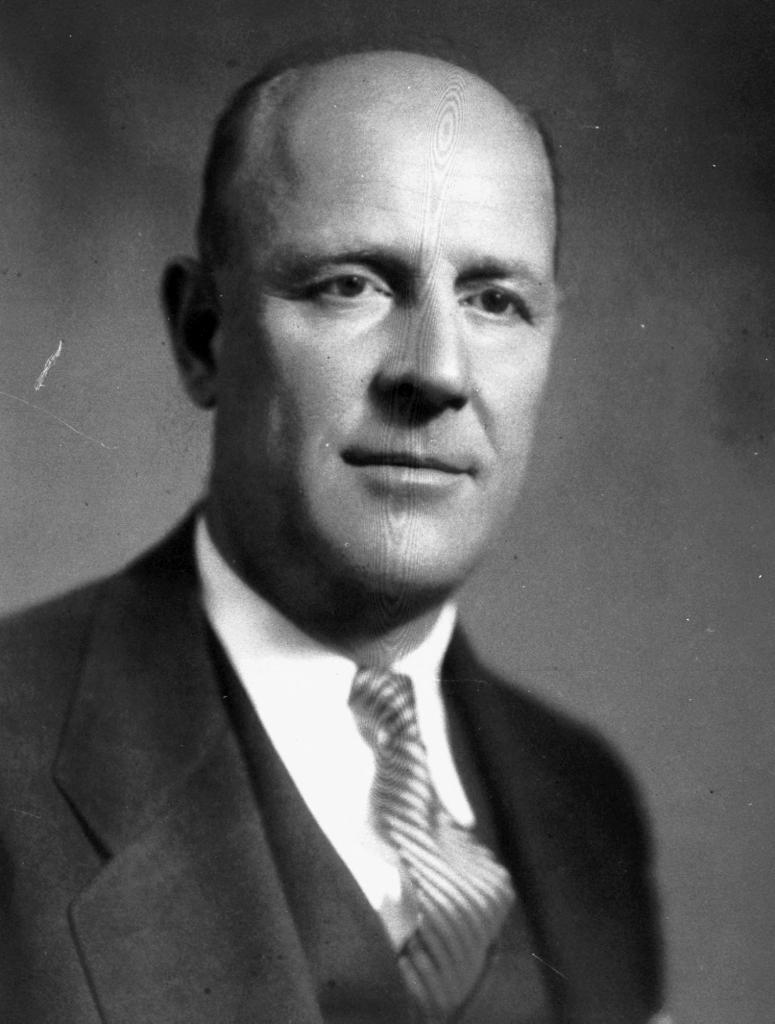

United States Commissioner of Education
- In office June 2, 1921 – September 1, 1928
- President: Warren G. Harding; Calvin Coolidge
- Preceded by: Philander Claxton
- Succeeded by: William Cooper

Personal details
- Born: February 11, 1882 Nashville, Tennessee, U.S.
- Died: January 21, 1965 (aged 82) Gainesville, Florida, U.S.
- Spouse: Edith Jackson Bristol
- Education: Vanderbilt University (BA); Pembroke College, Oxford (MA)
- Coaching career

Playing career

Football
- 1901–1903: Vanderbilt
- Positions: Halfback, fullback

Coaching career (HC unless noted)

Football
- 1909: Central (MO)
- 1910: Kentucky Wesleyan
- 1915–1916: Kentucky

Basketball
- 1913: Kentucky
- 1916–1917: Kentucky

Administrative career (AD unless noted)
- 1913–1917: Kentucky

Head coaching record
- Overall: 17–6–4 (football)

Accomplishments and honors

Awards
- All-Southern (1903)
- College Football Hall of Fame; Inducted in 1970 (profile)

John James Tigert IV (February 11, 1882 – January 21, 1965) was an American university president, university professor and administrator, college sports coach and the U.S. Commissioner of Education. Tigert was a native of Tennessee and the son and grandson of Methodist bishops. After receiving his bachelor's degree, he earned his master's degree as a Rhodes Scholar.

After completing his education, Tigert taught at Central College; served as the president of Kentucky Wesleyan College; and worked as a professor, sports coach and administrator at the University of Kentucky.

Tigert gained his greatest national prominence as the U.S. Commissioner of Education, from 1921 to 1928, and as the third president of the University of Florida, from 1928 to 1947. He is remembered as a forceful advocate for American public education, intercollegiate sports, and university curriculum reform.

== Early life and education ==
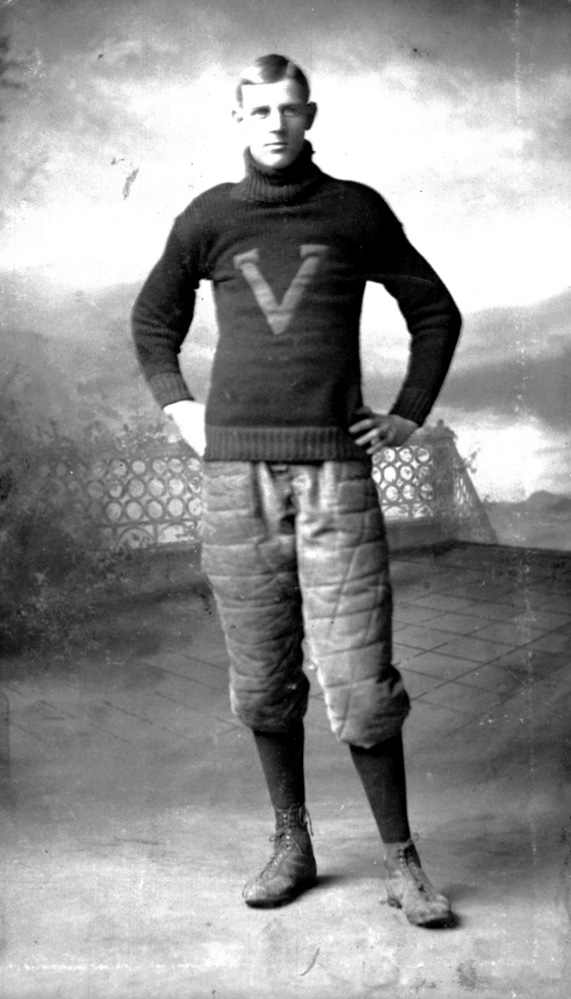
Tigert as Vanderbilt football player in 1903

Tigert was born in Nashville, Tennessee, in 1882, the third son of a Methodist Episcopal minister, John James Tigert III, and his wife, Amelia McTyeire Tigert, the daughter of Methodist Bishop and Vanderbilt University co-founder Holland N. McTyeire. Tigert received his primary education in the public schools of Kansas City, Missouri, and Nashville, and earned his high school diploma, with honors, from the Webb School in Bell Buckle, Tennessee.

=== Vanderbilt ===
He was admitted to Vanderbilt University in Nashville, where he was a member of the Phi Delta Theta fraternity (Tennessee Alpha Chapter) and a standout athlete in baseball, basketball, football and track. His time at Vanderbilt overlaps with Grantland Rice. As a senior, Tigert was honored as an All-Southern halfback for the Vanderbilt Commodores football team. In his final game, he scored the first points netted all season against rival Sewanee.

Tigert graduated from Vanderbilt with a Bachelor of Arts degree in 1904; he was selected for Phi Beta Kappa, and was chosen as a Rhodes Scholar, the first from the state of Tennessee, along with teammate Bob Blake. While at Oxford University in Oxford, England, he completed his Master of Arts degree at Pembroke College in 1907, and he continued to participate in competitive university sports, including cricket, rowing and tennis.

== Educator, administrator, reformer ==
After returning to the United States, Tigert taught at the Methodist-affiliated Central College—now known as Central Methodist University—in Fayette, Missouri, and, at the age of 27, was appointed president of Kentucky Wesleyan College in Owensboro, Kentucky in 1909. That same year, he married the former Edith Jackson Bristol.

=== University of Kentucky ===
Tigert later received an appointment as a professor of psychology and philosophy at the University of Kentucky in Lexington, Kentucky, where he did work on psychology in advertising. While there, Tigert also served as the athletic director from 1913 to 1917, the Kentucky Wildcats men's basketball coach in 1913, 1916 and 1917, the Wildcats women's basketball coach from 1911 to 1915 and again from 1916 to 1917, and the Wildcats football coach in 1915 and 1916.

=== Commissioner of Education ===
President Warren G. Harding appointed Tigert as the U.S. Commissioner of Education in 1921, and he served for seven years during the administrations of Harding and Calvin Coolidge. As commissioner, he was an energetic advocate of education reform and greater educational opportunities for all classes of Americans, and he traveled widely and spoke often to virtually any group interested in education. In particular, he took an interest in rural education, and advocated innovative ways to impart public education to a wider audience, including the use of radio. During his time in Washington, D.C., he also served a term as the national president of Phi Delta Theta Fraternity.

=== University of Florida ===
The Florida Board of Control selected Tigert as the third president of the University of Florida in Gainesville, Florida in 1928. He assumed leadership of the university during an extended period of economic crisis in the state of Florida. When the Great Depression began with the Wall Street Crash of 1929, Florida was already suffering from the after-effects of the 1920s land boom and bust, as well the devastating aftermath of two major hurricanes in 1926 and 1928.

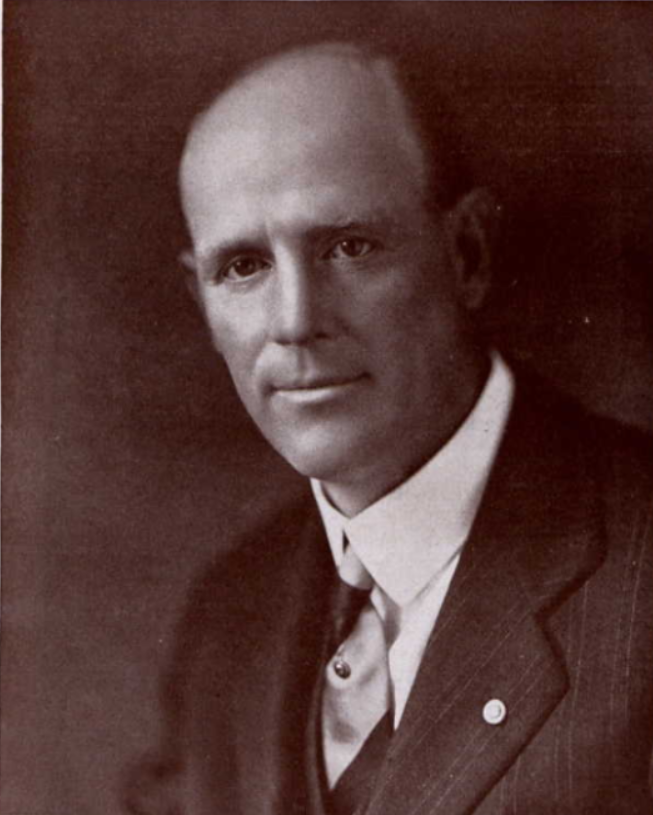
Tigert from the 1930 Seminole yearbook

The common thread of the nineteen years of Tigert's administration was doing more with less. Faculty salary cuts were common; Tigert himself never drew his full authorized annual salary of $10,000. Among Tigert's many significant reforms, he decentralized the university budget to the level of the individual academic colleges, allowing them to set their own spending priorities. The University Council, composed of the president, the registrar and the college deans, retained final approval authority. Tigert also established the faculty senate, the Institute of Inter-American Affairs and the Bureau of Economic and Business Research.

One of his most influential reforms as president was the founding of the new University College as an academic division within the University of Florida in 1935. The college was modeled on the general education college at the University of Chicago, and administered the freshman and sophomore-year liberal arts education of undergraduates before they were accepted to the university schools or colleges that administered their academic majors. The college's stated purpose was to "stimulate intellectual curiosity" and "encourage independent work", with new liberal arts requirements in biology, English language and literature, the humanities, logic, mathematics, physical sciences and social sciences, and thereby counter the growing trend toward "trade school" education at the university level.

As a former university athlete and coach, Tigert took a particular interest in athletics-related policy issues while he was president and was an enthusiastic supporter of the Florida Gators sports program generally, and football in particular. He was responsible for the construction of the university's first and only permanent football stadium, Florida Field, in 1930. He borrowed $10,000 to begin construction of the stadium, and then raised $118,000 to pay the construction costs of the 22,800-seat facility. Tigert also hired Blake R. Van Leer as Dean to expand the engineering program and manage all applications for federal funding. Van Leer also chaired the advanced planning committee setup by Tigert. Tigert was also instrumental in the organization of the Southeastern Conference (SEC), which the University of Florida joined as one of the thirteen founding institutions in December 1932. Tigert subsequently served two terms as SEC president (1934–1936 and 1945–1947). As a key leader within the SEC, he worked to impose a uniform set of rules and standards for academic eligibility for SEC athletes. Appalled by the under-the-table payments to amateur college athletes that were prevalent at the time, he advocated the grant of scholarships to athletes which would become the grant-in-aid of other university athletic programs and as mandated by the National Collegiate Athletic Association (NCAA) in the years to follow.

Like his predecessor, Albert A. Murphree, Tigert was elected president of the National Association of State Universities, serving from 1939 to 1940.

Following the Japanese attack on Pearl Harbor on December 7, 1941, students began to withdraw from the university in large numbers to enlist in the U.S. Armed Forces. The financial impact on the university had the potential to be devastating, but Tigert navigated the war years by making the university campus, dormitories and class rooms available for the training of U.S. Army Air Force flight crews. Veterans began to return to school with support from the GI Bill, and by the fall term of 1946, over seventy percent of the University of Florida's 7,000 students were returning World War II veterans. Contributing to the shortage of facility space was the influx of new female students when the Florida Legislature reinstituted co-education in 1947. The university suddenly had more students than its available housing and classroom space could serve.

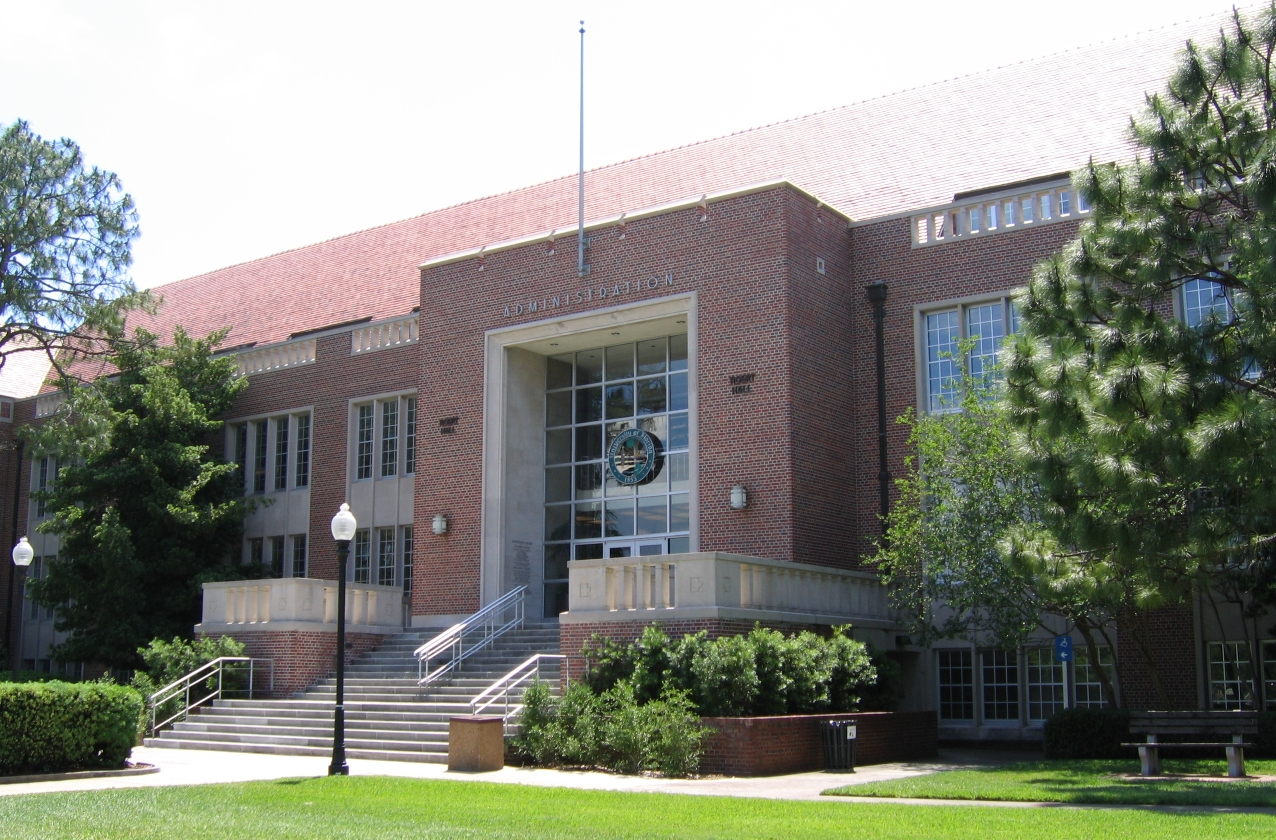
Tigert Hall, the main administration building of the University of Florida in Gainesville, Florida, was completed in 1950, and renamed for John J. Tigert, the third president of the university (1928–1947), in 1960.

Tigert resigned as university president in 1947, worked as an educational consultant to the government of India as a member of its University Education Commission, and taught philosophy at the University of Miami until 1959.

==== Legacy ====
Tigert served as president of the University of Florida for nineteen years, longer than any of the other presidents of the university. During his term, the university awarded its first doctoral degrees in 1934, a chapter of Phi Beta Kappa was installed in 1938, and total student enrollment grew from 2,162 in 1928 to over 7,500 in 1947. As university president, he was responsible for significant and lasting academic, athletic and administrative reforms.

In recognition of Tigert's long service as its president through depression and war, the University of Florida awarded him an honorary degree, a doctor of letters, during its 1953 centennial celebration, and renamed its main administrative building, Tigert Hall, for him in 1960. Tigert died in Gainesville, Florida on January 21, 1965; he was 82 years old. He was survived by his wife Edith, their son and daughter, and five grandchildren.

Tigert was inducted into the University of Florida Athletic Hall of Fame as an "Honorary Letter Winner," and was elected to the College Football Hall of Fame as a player in 1970.

== Head coaching record ==
=== Football ===
Year	Team	Overall	Conference	Standing	Bowl/playoffs
Central Eagles (Independent) (1909)
1909	Central	6–2			
Central:		6–2			
Kentucky Wesleyan Panthers (Independent) (1910)
1910	Kentucky Wesleyan	1–2–1			
Kentucky Wesleyan:		1–2–1			
Kentucky Wildcats (Southern Intercollegiate Athletic Association) (1915–1916)
1915	Kentucky	6–1–1	2–1–1	9th	
1916	Kentucky	4–1–2	2–1–2	10th	
Kentucky:		10–2–3	4–2–3		
Total:		17–6–4			

=== Men's basketball ===
Record table
Season	Team	Overall	Conference	Standing	Postseason
Kentucky Wildcats (Southern Intercollegiate Athletic Association) (1913)
1913	Kentucky	5–3	1–1		
Kentucky:		5–3	1–1		
Kentucky Wildcats (Southern Intercollegiate Athletic Association) (1916–1917)
1916	Kentucky	8–6	5–5		
1917	Kentucky	4–6	3–2		
Kentucky:		12–12	8–7		
Total:		17–15	9–8		

=== Women's basketball ===
Record table
Season	Team	Overall	Conference	Standing	Postseason
Kentucky Wildcats (Independent) (1911–1915)
1911–12	Kentucky	4–1			
1912–13	Kentucky	5–0			
1913–14	Kentucky	4–2			
1914–15	Kentucky	5–1			
Kentucky:		18–4			
Kentucky Wildcats (Independent) (1916–1917)
1916–17	Kentucky	5–0			
Kentucky:		5–0			
Total:		23–4			

== See also ==
- History of Florida
- History of the University of Florida
- List of College Football Hall of Fame inductees (players, A–K)
- List of College Football Hall of Fame inductees (players, L–Z)
- List of Oxford University people
- List of Phi Beta Kappa members
- List of Phi Delta Theta members
- List of Rhodes Scholars
- List of University of Florida honorary degree recipients
- List of University of Florida presidents
- List of University of Florida Athletic Hall of Fame members
- List of Vanderbilt University people
- State University System of Florida

== Bibliography ==
- Johnson, E. Polk, A History of Kentucky and Kentuckians: The Leaders and Representative Men in Commerce, Industry and Modern Activities, Vol. II, Lewis Publishing Company, Chicago, Illinois, pp. 827–830 (1912).
- Osborn, George Coleman, John James Tigert: American Educator, The University Presses of Florida, Gainesville, Florida (1974). ISBN 0-8130-0498-5.
- Pleasants, Julian M., Gator Tales: An Oral History of the University of Florida, University of Florida, Gainesville, Florida (2006). ISBN 0-8130-3054-4.
- Proctor, Samuel, & Wright Langley, Gator History: A Pictorial History of the University of Florida, South Star Publishing Company, Gainesville, Florida (1986). ISBN 0-938637-00-2.
- Van Ness, Carl, & Kevin McCarthy, Honoring the Past, Shaping the Future: The University of Florida, 1853–2003, University of Florida, Gainesville, Florida (2003).

Political offices
Preceded by Philander Claxton	United States Commissioner of Education; 1921–1928	Succeeded by William Cooper
