= John James Tigert III =

American editor and academic (1856–1906)

- Born: November 25, 1856; Louisville, Kentucky, U.S.
- Died: November 21, 1906 (aged 49); Tulsa, Oklahoma, U.S.
- Education: Vanderbilt University; Emory and Henry College; University of Missouri
- Occupation: Bishop
- Employer: Methodist Episcopal Church, South
- Children: John J. Tigert
- Relatives: Holland N. McTyeire

John James Tigert III (November 25, 1856 – November 21, 1906) was an American clergyman, editor and academic. He was a professor of Moral Philosophy at Vanderbilt University, and a Bishop of the Methodist Episcopal Church, South.

== Early life ==
Tigert was born on November 25, 1856, in Louisville, Kentucky.

Tigert graduated from Vanderbilt University in 1877. He also attended Emory and Henry College and the University of Missouri.

== Career ==
Tigert was a professor of Moral Philosophy at his alma mater, Vanderbilt University, from 1881 to 1890. He was a pastor in Kansas City, Missouri from 1890 to 1894, and he was elected as the editor of the books published by the M.E. Church as well as the Methodist Quarterly Review in 1894. He was appointed as a bishop of the Methodist Episcopal Church, South on May 17, 1906. He became "one of the most prominent leaders of the Southern Methodist Church."

Tigert was the author of several books.

== Personal life and death ==
Tigert married Amelia McTyeire, the daughter of Methodist Bishop and Vanderbilt University co-founder Holland N. McTyeire, on August 28, 1878. They had a son, John J. Tigert, who served as the United States Commissioner of Education from 1921 to 1928, and the third president of the University of Florida, from 1928 to 1947. They resided in Spring Hill, Tennessee.

Tigert fell ill after a chicken bone got stuck in his throat on November 14, 1906. He died on November 21, 1906, in Tulsa, Oklahoma.

== Selected works ==
- Tigert, John James. Handbook of Logic.
- Tigert, John James. Theology and Philosophy.
- Tigert, John James (1889). The Preacher Himself. Nashville, Tennessee: Publishing House of the M.E. Church, South. OCLC 26060289.
- Tigert, John James (1892). A Voice from the South. Nashville, Tennessee: Publishing House of the M.E. Church, South. OCLC 10902914.
- Tigert, John James (1901). Theism: A Survey of the Paths that Lead to God. Nashville, Tennessee: Publishing House of the Methodist Episcopal Church, South. OCLC 224223897.
- Tigert, John James (1911). Constitutional History of American Episcopal Methodism.
