= Craig J. Ostler =

Craig James Ostler (born 1954) is an American historian of the Church of Jesus Christ of Latter-day Saints (LDS Church) and a professor of Church History and Doctrine at Brigham Young University (BYU).

Ostler served a mission for the LDS Church in the Colombia Bogotá mission. Prior to joining the BYU faculty Ostler was an instructor with the Church Educational System. Ostler received his Ph.D. from BYU.

In the LDS Church Ostler has served as a bishop. He and his wife Sandy are the parents of seven children. He currently lives in Pleasant Grove, Utah.

Ostler's main area of expertise is the Doctrine and Covenants and sites related to the early history of the LDS Church; he has compiled photographs from these early sites.

Along with Susan Easton Black and Joseph Fielding McConkie, Ostler was a creator of much of the material at Virtual Historian.

== Works ==
- Joseph Fielding McConkie and Craig J. Ostler. Revelations of the Restoration.
- Guy L. Dorius, Craig K. Manscill and Ostler, ed., Regional Studies in Latter-day Saint History: Ohio and Upper Canada.
- John P. Livingstone, W. Jeffrey Marsh, Lloyd D. Newell, John P. Starrs, David M. Whitchurch and Ostler. Hallow Ground, Sacred Journeys: Salt Lake City, An Ensign to The Nations.
- Ostler has also been a co-editor of the compilation of the Sperry Symposium talks on at least three occasions.
