= David O. McKay and the Rise of Modern Mormonism =

- Author: Gregory Prince and Wm. Robert Wright
- Language: English
- Subject: David O. McKay
- Genre: Biography
- Published: 2005 (University of Utah Press)
- Publication place: United States
- Media type: Print (Hardcover)
- Pages: 490
- ISBN: 0-87480-822-7
- OCLC: 57311904
- Dewey Decimal: 289.3/092 B 22
- LC Class: BX8695.M27 P75 2005

David O. McKay and the Rise of Modern Mormonism is a biography of David O. McKay, the ninth president of The Church of Jesus Christ of Latter-day Saints. It is the first book to draw upon the David O. McKay Papers at the J. Willard Marriott Library, University of Utah, in addition to some two hundred interviews conducted by the authors, Gregory Prince and William Robert Wright. The work was first published on March 9, 2005, through the University of Utah Press and was met with mixed reviews.

Based largely on an extensive body of records gathered and maintained by McKay's longtime secretary, Clare Middlemiss, the book focuses on the years of McKay's presidency, during which the Church of Jesus Christ of Latter-day Saints faced the challenges of worldwide growth in an age of communism, the American Civil Rights Movement, and ecumenism.

== Reception ==
The Journal of Mormon History praised the book as a "fine example of the bookmaker's art, the oversize volume is beautifully designed and brilliantly executed" and commented that although they had initially held concerns about the work being based predominantly on the Middlemiss diaries, they grew more confident on the material's accuracy, the further they read in the book. The journal Church History also gave a favorable review, stating that it should be "required reading in American Religion". The Deseret News was more critical in their review, writing that there was "a huge and interesting body of material here that will be fascinating to both general readers and historians" but that it "suffers from the use of huge, undigested quotations from McKay and a number of church leaders and associates. A trained historian would have pared down the material, done some paraphrasing and devoted precious time to analyzing the evidence."

=== Awards ===
- Evans Handcart Award (2005, won)
- Best Biography Award from the Mormon History Association (2005, won)
- Best Utah History Book Award from the Utah State Historical Society (2005, won)

== Publication information ==
- Prince, Gregory and Wright, Wm. Robert. David O. McKay and the Rise of Modern Mormonism. University of Utah Press, Salt Lake City, UT, 2005. ISBN 0-87480-822-7.
