= Gregory Prince =

American pathology researcher (born 1948)

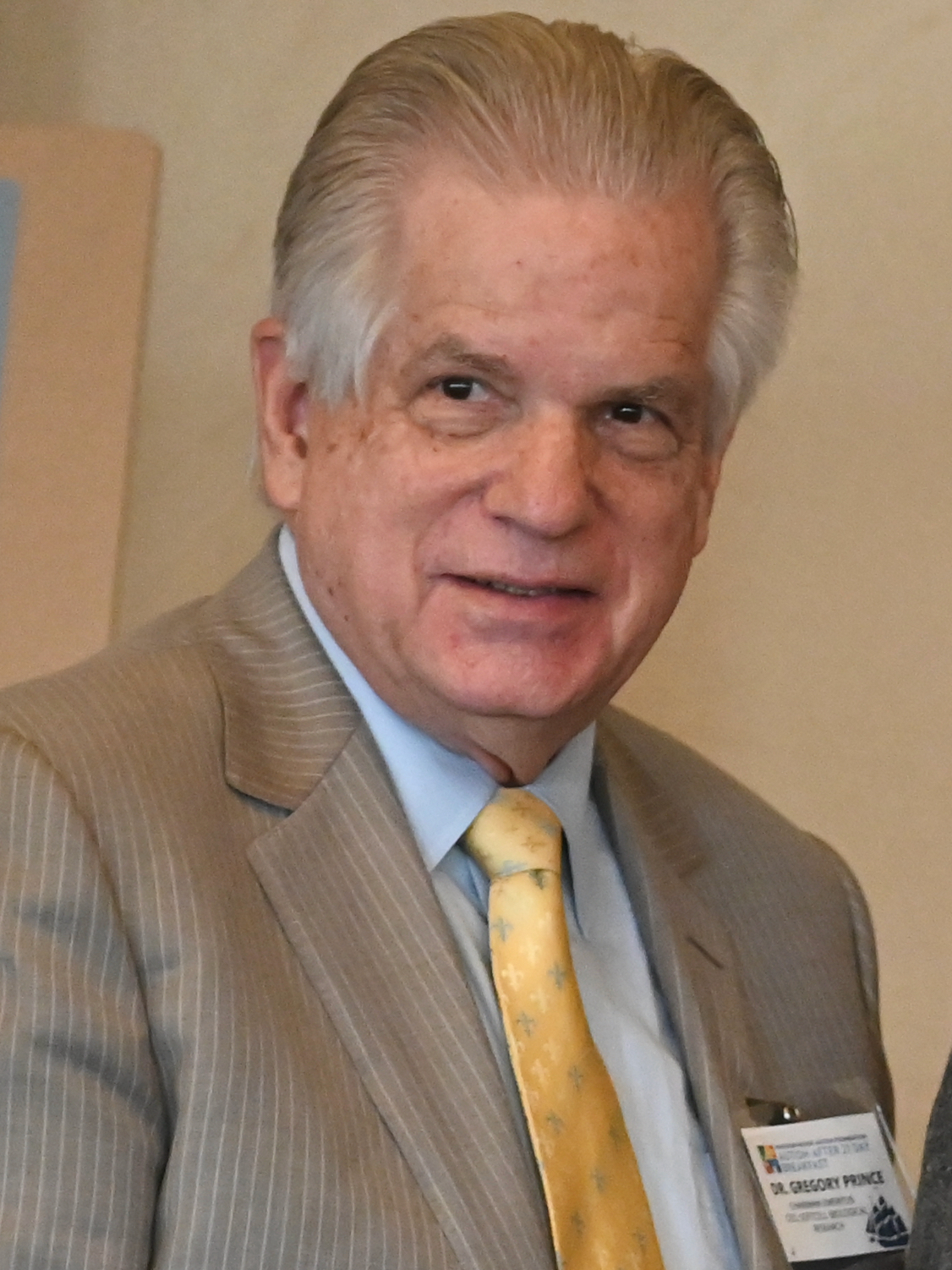
- Prince in 2023
- Born: 1948 (age 77–78)
- Occupations: Researcher, businessman, and historian

Gregory Antone Prince (born 1948) is an American pathology researcher, businessman, author, social critic, and historian of the Latter Day Saint movement.

== Early life and education ==
Prince was born and raised in Los Angeles, California. After graduating as valedictorian from Utah Tech University (formerly Dixie State University), he served a two-year mission in Brazil for the Church of Jesus Christ of Latter-day Saints (LDS Church) at age 19. Upon returning to the United States in 1969, Prince attended graduate school at the University of California, Los Angeles, receiving a D.D.S. (valedictorian) in 1973 and a Ph.D. in pathology in 1975. That same year, he and his wife, JaLynn Rasmussen, moved to Washington D.C., for a postdoctoral fellowship at the National Institutes of Health.

== Career ==
After more than a decade at NIH and Johns Hopkins University, Prince co-founded Virion Systems, Inc. (VSI), a biotechnology company focused on preventing and treating pediatric infectious diseases. Building on discoveries Prince made as a doctoral student, VSI pioneered a monoclonal antibody to prevent respiratory syncytial virus (RSV) disease in high-risk infants. VSI licensed its technologies to MedImmune, Inc., and the collaboration between the two companies and other partners led to the U.S. Food and Drug Administration's approval of Synagis.

In 2020, Prince became CEO of Soft Cell Biological Research, Inc. and its subsidiary company, Soft Cell Labs, Inc. Both labs focus on the role of L-form bacteria (bacteria that shed their cell walls and thus become capable of evading the immune system) in chronic human diseases.

Prince serves on the boards of several non-profit institutions including the National Advisory Council, Utah Tech University; the Dean's Advisory Council, University of Utah School of Dentistry; and the Board of Governors, Wesley Theological Seminary.

In the 2010s, Prince began to call for a better understanding, within the views common among Latter-day Saints, of certain causal relationships between biology and sexual orientation.

In recognition of his lifetime achievements, Prince was inducted into the Dixie State College Hall of Fame in 1999, and in 2012 was awarded an Honorary Doctorate of Humanities by the same institution. In 2013 he was named Alumnus of the Year of the UCLA School of Dentistry, and in 2017 he was given the Distinguished Service Award by Utah State University.

Prince was one of several leading figures in Mormon studies interviewed for the PBS documentary The Mormons.

== Personal life ==
He lives with his family in Potomac, Maryland.

In 2008, Prince and his wife established the Madison House Autism Foundation, named after their youngest son who is autistic, for the purpose of addressing the perplexing issues facing adults with autism, along with those facing family members, caregivers and society at large.

== Publications ==
Prince is the author of over 150 scientific publications in the field of infectious diseases, the majority dealing with RSV. He has also published several articles on religious history and theology, as well as five books in the same field: Having Authority: The Origins and Development of Priesthood During the Ministry of Joseph Smith (1993); Power from On High: The Development of Mormon Priesthood (1995); David O. McKay and the Rise of Modern Mormonism (2005), co-authored with William Robert Wright; Leonard Arrington and the Writing of Mormon History (2016); and Gay Rights and the Mormon Church: Intended Actions, Unintended Consequences (2019). The McKay book was the recipient of four prestigious awards, and the Arrington book received the Evans Biography Award. In 2023, he was given the Leonard J. Arrington Award for Lifetime Achievement by the Mormon History Association, the highest award given by that organization.

=== Scientific journals ===
The following is a partial list of published scientific articles in which Prince was a lead author:

- Narayanasamy Elango; Gregory A. Prince; Brian R. Murphy; Sundararajan Venkatesan; Robert M. Chanock; Bernard Moss (March 15, 1986). "Resistance to Human Respiratory Syncytial Virus (RSV) Infection Induced by Immunization of Cotton Rats with a Recombinant Vaccinia Virus Expressing the RSV G Glycoprotein". Proceedings of the National Academy of Sciences. 83 (6): 1906–1910. Bibcode:1986PNAS...83.1906E. doi:10.1073/pnas.83.6.1906. PMC 323193. PMID 3513191.
- Val G. Hemming; Gregory A. Prince (May–June 1990). "Immunoprophylaxis of Infections with Respiratory Syncytial Virus: Observations and Hypothesis [with Discussion]". Reviews of Infectious Diseases. 83 (6): S470–S475.
- Gregory A. Prince; David D. Porter (1996). "Treatment of Parainfluenza Virus Type 3 Bronchiolitis and Pneumonia in a Cotton Rat Model Using Topical Antibody and Glucocorticosteroid". The Journal of Infectious Diseases. 173 (3): 598–608. doi:10.1093/infdis/173.3.598. PMID 8627023.
- Linda G. Byrd; Gregory A. Prince (December 1997). "Animal Models of Respiratory Syncytial Virus Infection". Clinical Infectious Diseases. 25 (6): 1363–68. doi:10.1086/516152. PMC 5244256. PMID 27908639.
- Raymond J. Langley; Gregory A. Prince; Harold S. Ginsberg (November 24, 1998). "HIV Type-1 Infection of the Cotton Rat (Sigmodon fulviventer and S. hispidus)". Proceedings of the National Academy of Sciences. 95 (24): 14355–14360. Bibcode:1998PNAS...9514355L. doi:10.1073/pnas.95.24.14355. PMC 24377. PMID 9826704.
- Gregory A. Prince; Jean-Paul Prieels; Moncef Slaoui; David D. Porter (1999). "Pulmonary Lesions in Primary Respiratory Syncytial Virus Infection, Reinfection, and Vaccine-Enhanced Disease in the Cotton Rat (Sigmodon hispidus)". Laboratory Investigation (11). United States and Canadian Academy of Pathology: 1385.
- Gregory A. Prince; Amy Mathews; Spencer J. Curtis; David D. Porter (2000). "Treatment of Respiratory Syncytial Virus Bronchiolitis and Pneumonia in a Cotton Rat Model with Systemically Administered Monoclonal Antibody (Palivizumab) and Glucocorticosteroid". The Journal of Infectious Diseases (5): 1326.
- Gregory A. Prince; Carine Capiau; Marguerite Deschamps; Luc Fabry; Nathalie Garcon; Dirk Gheysen; Jean-Paul Prieels; Georges Thiry; Omer Van Opstal; David D. Porter (2000). "VACCINES AND ANTIVIRAL AGENTS - Efficacy and Safety Studies of a Recombinant Chimeric Respiratory Syncytial Virus FG Glycoprotein Vaccine in Cotton Rats". Journal of Virology (22): 10287.
- Gregory A. Prince; Amy Mathews; Spencer J. Curtis; David D. Porter (2001). "CORRESPONDENCE - Reply - Neutralizing Antiviral Antibodies Reduce Hematogenic Viral Spread but Not Antiviral Cytotoxic T Cell Induction and Subsequent Immunopathology". The Journal of Infectious Diseases (9): 1426.
- Gregory A. Prince; Martin G. Ottolini; Anne Moscona (2001). "PATHOGENESIS AND IMMUNITY - Contribution of the Human Parainfluenza Virus Type 3 HN-Receptor Interaction to Pathogenesis In Vivo". Journal of Virology (24): 12446.
- L. Patterson; Gregory A. Prince; Ersell Richardson; W. Alvord; Narender Kalyan; Marjorie Robert-Guroff (2002). "Insertion of HIV-1 Genes into Ad4ΔE3 Vector Abrogates Increased Pathogenesis in Cotton Rats Due to E3 Deletion". Virology. 292 (1): 107–13. doi:10.1006/viro.2001.1248. PMID 11878913.
- Stefan Niewiesk; Gregory A. Prince (2002). "Diversifying animal models: the use of hispid cotton rats (Sigmodon hispidus) in infectious diseases". Laboratory Animals. 36 (4). Royal Society of Medicine Press: 357–72. doi:10.1258/002367702320389026. PMID 12396279. S2CID 28914176.
- Gregory A. Prince; James J. Mond; David D. Porter; Kevin C. Yim; Steve J. Lan; Dennis M. Klinman (2003). "VACCINES AND ANTIVIRAL AGENTS - Immunoprotective Activity and Safety of a Respiratory Syncytial Virus Vaccine: Mucosal Delivery of Fusion Glycoprotein with a CpG Oligodeoxynucleotide Adjuvant". Journal of Virology (24): 13156.
- Maryna C. Eichelberger; Gregory A. Prince; Martin G. Ottolini (2004). "Influenza-induced tachypnea is prevented in immune cotton rats, but cannot be treated with an anti-inflammatory steroid or a neuraminidase inhibitor". Virology. 322 (2): 300–7. doi:10.1016/j.virol.2004.01.032. PMID 15110527.
- Marie-Ève Hamelin; Gregory A. Prince; Guy Boivin (2006). "Effect of Ribavirin and Glucocorticoid Treatment in a Mouse Model of Human Metapneumovirus Infection". Antimicrobial Agents and Chemotherapy. 50 (2): 774–7. doi:10.1128/AAC.50.2.774-777.2006. PMC 1366914. PMID 16436743.
- Marie-Ève Hamelin; Gregory A. Prince; Ana M. Gomez; Richard Kinkead; Guy Boivin (2006). "Human Metapneumovirus Infection Induces Long-Term Pulmonary Inflammation Associated with Airway Obstruction and Hyperresponsiveness in Mice". The Journal of Infectious Diseases (12): 1634.
- Marina S. Boukhvalova; Gregory A. Prince; Jorge C. G. Blanco (2007). "Respiratory Syncytial Virus Infects and Abortively Replicates in the Lungs in Spite of Preexisting Immunity". Journal of Virology. 81 (17): 9443–50. doi:10.1128/JVI.00102-07. PMC 1951413. PMID 17596309.
- Marina S. Boukhvalova; Gregory A. Prince; Jorge C. G. Blanco (2009). "The cotton rat model of respiratory viral infections". Biologicals. 37 (3). Academic Press: 152–9. doi:10.1016/j.biologicals.2009.02.017. PMC 2882635. PMID 19394861.

=== Mormon studies ===
The following is a list of Prince's books and articles relating to Mormonism.

- Prince, Gregory A. (Autumn 1978). "A Bibliography of Mormon Reprints". Dialogue: A Journal of Mormon Thought. 11 (3): 120–23. doi:10.2307/45224708. JSTOR 45224708. S2CID 254389175.
- Having Authority: The Origins and Development of Priesthood during the Ministry of Joseph Smith. John Whitmer Historical Association Monograph Series. Independence, Missouri: Independence Press. 1993. ISBN 0-8309-0635-5.
- Power from on High: The Development of Mormon Priesthood. Salt Lake City: Signature Books. 1995. ISBN 1-56085-071-X.
- "Paradigm Lost" (PDF). Sunstone. 18 (3): 79–83. December 1995.
- Prince, Gregory A. (Winter 2000). "David O. McKay and the 'Twin Sisters': Free Agency and Tolerance". Dialogue: A Journal of Mormon Thought. 33 (4): 1–13. doi:10.2307/45226734. JSTOR 45226734. S2CID 254301557.
- Prince, Gregory A. (Spring 2002). "David O. McKay and Blacks: Building the Foundation for the 1978 Revelation". Dialogue: A Journal of Mormon Thought. 35 (1): 145–53. doi:10.2307/45226835. JSTOR 45226835. S2CID 254343744.
- "[Review of] D. Michael Quinn. Elder Statesman: A Biography of J. Reuben Clark". Journal of Mormon History. 28 (2): 174–80. Fall 2002. Archived from the original on 2011-06-14.
- Prince, Gregory A. (Summer 2004). "The Red Peril, the Candy Maker, and the Apostle: David O. McKay's Confrontation with Communism". Dialogue: A Journal of Mormon Thought. 37 (2): 37–94. doi:10.2307/45227582. JSTOR 45227582. S2CID 254391712.
- "[Review of] Kahlile B. Mehr. Mormon Missionaries Enter Eastern Europe". Journal of Mormon History. 30 (2): 263–69. Fall 2004. Archived from the original on 2011-06-13.
- David O. McKay and the Rise of Modern Mormonism. Salt Lake City: University of Utah Press. 2005. ISBN 0-87480-822-7. Coauthored with Wm. Robert Wright.
- "A Turbulent Coexistence: Duane Hunt, David O. McKay, and a Quarter-Century of Catholic-Mormon Relations". Journal of Mormon History. 31 (1): 142–63. Spring 2005.
- Prince, Gregory A.; Gray, Darius A.; Young, Margaret Blair (Fall 2009). "'Let the Truth Heal': The Making of Nobody Knows: The Untold Story of Black Mormons". Dialogue: A Journal of Mormon Thought. 42 (3): 74–128. doi:10.5406/dialjmormthou.42.3.0074. S2CID 171722015.
- Prince, Gregory A.; Rushforth, Brent N. (Winter 2009). "A Failure of Moral Imagination: Guantanamo, Torture, the Constitution, and Mormons- An Interview with Brent N. Rushforth". Dialogue: A Journal of Mormon Thought. 42 (4): 69–98. doi:10.5406/dialjmormthou.42.4.0069. S2CID 172030939.
- "[Review of] Gary Topping. Leonard J. Arrington: A Historian's Life". Western Historical Quarterly. 41 (1): 102–03. Spring 2010. doi:10.2307/westhistquar.41.1.0102.
