= Fiber to the premises in the United States =

Fiber to the premises (FTTP) in the United States is provided on a limited geographical basis by Google Fiber, Verizon, Zayo Group, and a number of smaller Internet Service Providers.

== By company ==
Company	Region(s)	Notes
Allband Multimedia	Curran, Michigan	Serves certain rural areas of Alcona, Alpena, and Montmorency counties in Michigan with the first all fiber to the home (FTTH) system in the state of Michigan, however the top speed offered is only 30/10 Mbit/s for residential customers and 30/30 Mbit/s for business customers.
ALLO Communications	Fort Morgan, Colorado; Lincoln, Nebraska; Western Nebraska	In 2016, ALLO Communications began 1 Gbit/s fiber internet service in Lincoln by utilizing the city's existing fiber network and building out its own. Citywide network completion is estimated by 2019. Telephone and cable TV service is also included, making it the third such company to compete for TV, 1 gigabit internet and telephone services within the same footprint.
AT&T (formerly SBC)	Dallas, Texas; South-Southwest United States	With its U-verse product, AT&T (formerly SBC) had pursued a strategy of Fiber to the Neighborhood (FTTN) and had even delivered Fiber to the Premises (FTTP) prior to the services' launch. Currently, U-verse is deployed as a Fiber to the Hub (FTTH) service; the line connecting the hub to the home is a dual copper pair line.
Burlington Telecom (City of Burlington)	Burlington, Vermont	Currently serves the residents and businesses in Burlington with a FTTH GPON network providing IPTV, phone, internet, MAN and colocation services.
CDE Lightband	Clarksville, Tennessee	Currently offering gig services to both residential and business customers in the city of Clarksville. The system has over 1000 miles of FTTP plant with an active Ethernet deployment.
Cedar Falls Utilities	Cedar Falls, Iowa	Actively building FTTP network throughout the entire community, with the goal to completely replace their HFC plant by the end of 2012.
Centurylink	Omaha, NE Las Vegas, NV Wake Forest, NC, Cape Coral, FL, Denver, CO, Seattle, WA, St George, UT, Salt Lake City, UT	Centurylink currently is deploying fiber to replace copper in two Prism TV markets, offering TV, and Internet at 1 Gbit/s
altafiber	Cincinnati, Ohio	altafiber currently offers access to their fiber network dubbed Fioptics and offers TV, Internet, and phone service. Internet speeds are offered as high as 1 Gbit/s download and 250 Mbit/s upload.
Comporium	Rock Hill, South Carolina (& Summerville, South Carolina through an affiliate)	"Named Zipstream, the service will provide internet speeds of 1,000 megabits per second – or one gigabit per second – to downtown Rock Hill by this summer, and will be offered to new businesses and residents of the Bleachery area as it is developed."
Connexion Technologies (formerly Capitol Infrastructure)	Various	Currently serves over 100 communities with FTTH services that include phone, internet, television and home security.
Consolidated Communications	Texas, Pennsylvania, Kansas	Offering FTTH in some new communities. Internet (100MBit down / 5MBit up), Phone, and Television.
ECFiber	East Central Vermont	Community network, services available via their fiber-optic network include telephone and broadband Internet
Elevate Fiber	Montrose, CO, Paonia, CO, Orchard City, CO, Cedaredge, CO, Delta, CO	Elevate Fiber, powered by DMEA, is building a 100% fiber network that will give you a whole new internet experience. We’re delivering blazing fast speeds on an ultra-reliable fiber network. Offering gigabit Internet, TV and Phone
EPBfi: a branch of EPB, the town electric power utility	600 square miles, 6 counties around Chattanooga, TN and environs	First gigabit (1000 Mbit/s) provider in North America; offers phone, TV, etc.,
Fibernet Monticello	Monticello, MN	City network providing residential and business services including TV, phone, and Internet.
GigabitNow	Issaquah, WA, The Sea Ranch, CA, Fullerton, CA, Placentia, CA, Bloomington, IN, Columbus, IN, Shelbyville, IN	Operates community gigabit fiber-optic networks as the Highlands Fiber Network, and Sea Ranch Connect. Also operates on open access networks in California and Indiana as GigabitNow.
Google Fiber	Kansas City, Provo, UT, Austin, Texas, Nashville, Atlanta, Salt Lake City, San Antonio, Texas, Charlotte, Research Triangle	Offers a free connection for construction, gigabit Internet, and TV
Hawaiian Telcom	Hawaii	"fiber to the building Internet speeds of up to 500/50 Mbit/s to residential and business customers … The available fiber tiers are 100 Mbit/s ($95), 200 Mbit/s ($200), or 500 Mbit/s ($300)."
Hotwire	Salisbury, NC	City network providing residential and business services including TV, phone, and Internet.
LymeFiber	Lyme, New Hampshire	A locally owned community network providing symmetric FTTP to homes and businesses in the town.
Newport Utilities	Newport, Tennessee	In progress of building a GPON FTTH network capable of delivering 1 Gbit/s symmetrical service to homes and businesses. The project is divided into several phases with each phase divided into several zones. The plan ultimately includes providing service to their entire electrical service area which includes Cocke county and some areas inside several surrounding counties. NUB will be one of the first utilities in the southeast to provide this valuable resource to such a rural and mountainous area.
North Georgia Network (NGN)	Georgia, North Carolina	"fiber to the building Internet speeds of up to 50d/50u for residential and 10 Gbps for business customers"
LUSFiber	Lafayette, LA	Municipal owned ftth network. Completed first phase of deployment of FTTH.
Metronet	Colorado, Florida, Illinois, Indiana, Iowa, Kentucky, Michigan, Minnesota, North Carolina, Ohio, Oklahoma, Texas, Virginia	Metronet was named PCMag's “Fastest Major ISP for 2024”.
Molalla Communications Company	Molalla, Oregon	Provides FTTP services to 100% of its subscriber base, offering a minimum of 250 Mbit/s to all subscribers, up to 1000 Mbit/s, using an active Ethernet topology.
Morristown Fibernet	Morristown, TN	Provides FTTP services to 100% of city and portions of the county (limited later by AT&T lobbying at the state level). Speeds up to 1 Gbit/s symmetric (up/down).
Midco	Midwest	Provides FTTP in numerous upper Midwest States including Kansas, Minnesota, North Dakota, South Dakota, and Wisconsin. Speeds up to 1Gb in many of the states Midco operates in; also offers business grade.
MTCO	Central Illinois	Provides FTTP in Germantown Hills, Marseilles, Metamora, and Washington, Illinois. Download speeds offered up to 200 Mbit/s.
Opelika Power Services	Opelika, Alabama	The first complete fiber network in Alabama that offers internet speeds up to 1 gigabit. This television, phone and internet network is available to every home and business in the city of Opelika.
Paxio Inc.	Bay Area, California	Offering up to 1 Gbit/s symmetric speeds to homes and businesses in S.F. Bay Area in California.
Peak Internet	Colorado	Currently offers services in Woodland Park, CO. Peak Internet offers Internet & Telephone services over fiber.
Pend Oreille County PUD	Newport, Washington	Offering 100 Mbit/s/100 Mbit/s FTTH Service to over 4,000 premises in South Pend Oreille County.
PES Energize	Pulaski, Tennessee	Provides video, voice and data services through an FTTP network
Qlevr Media Inc.	Georgia	The first FTTH provider in Georgia offering television, telephone, Internet access, and home security over a single fiber.
REV	Multiple parishes in South Louisiana, including Lafourche, Terrebonne, St. James, St. John, Ascension, Livingston and East Baton Rouge.	Services currently available via their fiber-optic network include telephone, broadband Internet and television, which includes video on demand and regular broadcasts
Ripple Fiber	North Carolina, South Carolina, Michigan, Massachusetts, Illinois, Colorado, Arkansas, Florida, Washington	Purchased by Eaton Fiber July 29, 2026, a Tillman Global partner for Verizon, which announced it is acquiring Ripple Fiber in a $1.5 billion investment round led by Bain Capital. Through this deal, Verizon will acquire Ripple Fiber’s existing customer base and transition them to the Verizon fiber broadband platform. Currently, provider of 100% fiber optic internet. Available service tiers include 650 Mbps, 1 Gig, 2 Gig, 5 Gig, and 8 Gig for homes, plus 1 Gig, 2 Gig, 5 Gig, and 8 Gig for small businesses. Uses Eero CPE for 1 Gig and higher speeds (Eero Max 7, with Eero Signal LTE backup, 100 GB per month on AT&T network).
Slic	Franklin County, New York Saint Lawrence County, New York Hamilton County, New York	Currently building out in these two counties. Selling up to 50 Mbit/s, but can provide up to 100 Mbit/s
T² Communications	Holland, Michigan	Delivers phone, television (IPTV) and Internet services, and is actively building its own fiber network.
Tombigbee Communications (FreedomFIBER)	Hamilton, Alabama	Subsidiary of rural electric cooperative Tombigbee Electric. Currently provides service to Marion County, Alabama, plans to expand to cover all of Fayette, Lamar, and Marion counties, with portions of Winston, Franklin, and Walker counties in Northwest Alabama. Provides up to 1 Gbit/s symmetrical service to all residential locations in service area, up to 10 Gbit/s service available for businesses, additionally, provides VoIP telephone service to all in service area.
TSC	St. Marys, Ohio	Completed deployment of FTTH, a first for the bright.net affiliates in Ohio.
TDS Telecommunications Corp.	Georgia, Minnesota, New Hampshire, Tennessee, and Wisconsin	1 Gbit/s FTTH. TDS continues to actively install and upgrade to fiber throughout its network.
US Internet	Minneapolis, Minnesota	Currently building out FTTP network in parts of Minneapolis.
Veracity Networks	Utah	Multiple FTTP installations in new or greenfield communities in the west, including a contract with the Utah State Trust Lands Administration for up to 21,000 units in Washington County, Utah.Before being acquired by Veracity, Broadweave's first community, Traverse Mountain, is Located in Lehi, Utah. Available in UTOPIA network areas. Ran on iProvo network before Google Fiber.
Verizon FiOS	NY, RI, CT, NJ, PA, DE, MD, DC, VA, NC	Regionally available in listed states; limited planned expansion in progress in Washington, D.C., Maryland, and Massachusetts.
VTel (Vermont Telephone Company)	Springfield, Vermont	Vtel serves 14 rural Vermont villages, based in Springfield, VT. By year-end 2013 they planned to offer "GigE billion-bits-per-second Internet over fiber to every VTel farm, home, and office, in all of our 14 rural villages"
Valu-Net LLC	Emporia Kansas	ValuNet FIBER serves Emporia Kansas with Gigabit Fiber service providing true gigabit Internet as well as a full complement of voice, data and IPTV services. (2016).
Stealth Communications	New York City	Offering up to 10 Gbit/s symmetric speeds to homes and businesses in New York City.
Windstream Communications	Lincoln, Nebraska; Southern U.S.	Beginning in 2016, Windstream Communications will be bringing 1 Gigabit per second fiber internet to Lincoln, using its existing fiber network. It is not initially clear how many homes or businesses would have access. Currently has FTTP available in many greenfield markets throughout the southern states.
Yomura Fiber	CO, GA, NC, SC	Symmetric Fiber Internet to homes and businesses. Speeds up to 10 Gbit/s.

== Open-access networks ==
Network	Region(s)	Service Providers
Chelan County PUD	Chelan County, WA	
UTOPIA	Utah	Advanced Stream, Beehive Broadband, Brigham.net, CentraCom, ConnectFast, Fibernet, InfoWest, Intellipop, Miles Broadband, Rise Broadband, Senawave, SumoFiber, Veracity Networks, Voonami, and Xmission.

Several carriers, municipalities, and planned communities across America are deploying their own fiber networks. Open Access Networks differ from incumbent models by being horizontally integrated, which allows for multiple service providers to operate on one network and promotes market competition. Among them is the City of Burlington, Vermont "Burlington Telecom" and Lafayette, Louisiana.

The city of San Francisco, California has released a feasibility study for government and public broadband via fiber optics. This was the result of San Francisco supervisors' vote to adopt a resolution to encourage certain city departments to consider installing FTTP for use primarily in city operations. This then evolved into the fiber feasibility study which also includes "services to businesses and residents." The study estimated build-out costs of $564 million. It has been released as a draft in order for members of the public to provide comments and input.

Service providers using Active FTTP technologies include YRT2 Inc.; PAXIO Inc.; SureWest; iProvo; Grant County, Washington; UTOPIA; CDE Lighband, Clarksville, TN and Broadweave Networks. Service providers using passive optical networks include Verizon (FiOS), AT&T (U-verse), and several greenfield development networks.

There is also another FTTH provider UTOPIA, based in Salt Lake County, Utah, which currently services 11 cities. This municipal fiber network is an open network to many local ISPs, including Xmission, Sumo, and Veracity, and other service providers who have bought onto the network. The speeds of the network range around 100 Mbit/s to 1 Gbit/s for residential use and 20 Mbit/s to 10 Gbit/s for business use.

Hargray Communications—Hilton Head Island, SC—Savannah, GA to Beaufort, SC—offers metro e - symmetrical data (up to 1g over 1g) 50x5

EPB Fiber Optics provides a GPON network that offers fiber to the premise to Chattanooga, TN and some neighboring cities. They offer 1Gig internet service, which is the fastest speed available in the nation, as well as TV and phone service.

In 2008, Greenlight was introduced in Wilson, North Carolina, which created the system at a cost of $28 million. The reason was the lack of interest in fiber optic from private companies.

With job losses, a major problem in Salisbury, North Carolina, the concept of municipal broadband was studied beginning in 2005. City council members looked at Wilson's system as an example of what Salisbury could do to help the economy. Also, Internet access in the city was slow.

Municipal power provider, CDE Lightband in Clarksville, TN launched their 1 Gig service in 2013 via an active FTTP plant. They also offer digital television and phone services.

== State laws and litigation ==
Fibrant in Salisbury, North Carolina was one of 60 municipal networks located across the country. The city borrowed $30 million to install the service, which offered faster Internet speeds at a lower price than competitors. The North Carolina General Assembly was considering legislation to stop such networks, which private companies opposed as the municipal utilities did not have to pay taxes and did not have the ability to subsidize.

On February 26, 2015, the FCC voted on a petition by Chattanooga, Tennessee and Wilson, North Carolina asking for "federal preemption of state laws". States opposed this effort to increase competition. South Carolina had a law which prevented governments from benefiting in ways private sector services could not. A service provided by Monticello, Minnesota had failed and bondholders sued, leading to concerns about who would pay if similar situations occurred as a result of the FCC action. After the FCC vote, U.S. Sen. Thom Tillis of North Carolina and Rep. Marsha Blackburn of Tennessee introduced bills to stop the action. On February 1, 2016, FCC Chairman Tom Wheeler recommended that the commission act on the petition. If the vote went in the cities' favor, the state laws would no longer be in effect and municipal systems could expand outside the cities.

After Tennessee and North Carolina appealed, on August 10, 2016, the Sixth Circuit Court of Appeals ruled that the Telecommunications Act of 1996 did not necessarily give the FCC the right to prevent states from prohibiting municipal broadband.
