= Mormon blogosphere =

Blogs by LDS church adherents

The Mormon blogosphere (often referred to as the Bloggernacle) is a segment of the blogosphere focused on issues related to the Church of Jesus Christ of Latter-day Saints (LDS Church).

The term "Bloggernacle" was coined by individuals within the Latter-day Saint blogging community as a play on the name of the Mormon Tabernacle Choir; however, not all Latter-day Saint-themed bloggers like or use the name Bloggernacle, or even consider their blog to be part of it. Furthermore, not all bloggers within the Mormon blogosphere are Latter-day Saints themselves.

== History ==
On November 23, 2002, the Mormon blogging community became a distinct entity with the founding of the blog Metaphysical Elders. Some component blogs from the Mormon blogosphere's first two years were short lived, however one of its first bloggers, Dave Banack, began his longstanding Mormon Inquiry blog on August 19, 2003. On January 1, 2003, a multi-author blog Mormon Momma launched – a spin-off from the original "Circle of Sisters" column from Meridian Magazine. By the next two years, many multi-author blogs were launched, including Times and Seasons, By Common Consent, Feminist Mormon Housewives, and Millennial Star. On March 23, 2004, due to an article in The Revealer, the writer Kaimi Wenger at the LDS blog Times and Seasons noticed that the Jewish and Catholic blogging communities had adopted names for themselves. In a blog post titled "The Nameless Mormon Blogosphere", Wenger sought to remedy this situation and asked for suggestions for a name. Christopher Bradford posting under the name "Grasshopper" suggested "Bloggernacle Choir", the shortened version of which gained wide approval. "Bloggernacle" is a term that has been used commonly by LDS bloggers.

The Latter-day Saint apologetic organization FairMormon features a website and blog; Jeff Lindsay began a Latter-day Saint apologetic blog entitled Mormanity in 2004. A Mormon "litblog" named A Motley Vision was founded in 2004 by William Morris. During 2005, several LDS-themed podcasts entered the Bloggernacle to augment Latter-day Saint blogging with audio programming; these included podcasts produced by church affiliated sources and an independent series, Mormon Stories Podcast, produced by John Dehlin (who also founded the blog Stay LDS and the group blog Mormon Matters).

Stay-at-home mothers who are LDS and who blog are known to comment occasionally upon their religion; two such writers whose blogs have become popular with non-Mormon audiences are Stephanie Nielson, of the blog the NieNie Dialogues, C. Jane Kendrick of CJane Enjoy It, and Jana Mathews who blogs at Momlogic as "The Meanest Mom". (A spoof on this genre of blog is the blog "Seriously, so Blessed!", written by an anonymous Utah woman.) In 2009, the religious news site Religion Dispatches ran a story about the phenomenon of Mormon mommy blogging, which its author believed arose in part in response to Elder M. Russell Ballard's 2007 commencement address at Brigham Young University–Hawaii, which had lauded efforts by Mormon faithful to share their beliefs through such means as blogging, citing an online post by "Bookslinger" (pseudonymous author of the blog Flooding the Earth with the Book of Mormon).

Mormon videographer Seth Adam Smith began blogging in 2004. Some of the Bloggernacle's more prominent blogs are named after defunct Latter-day Saint publications. For example, Messenger and Advocate, a blog written by Guy Murray, was named after the LDS publication of the same name published 1834–1837 in Kirtland, Ohio. Keepapitchinin, a Mormon history blog written by Salt Lake Tribune columnist and independent historian Ardis Parshall that she founded in 2008, was named after a sporadically published humorous newspaper published 1867–1871 and pseudonymously written by three sons of LDS apostles, George J. Taylor, Joseph C. Rich, and Heber John Richards. Parshall's blog has won several Bloggernacle awards. Additionally, one of Parshall's Keepapitchinin posts received an Association for Mormon Letters award (2010). The blog Millennial Star was named after The Latter-day Saints' Millennial Star, published in England 1840–1970; and the LDS history blog The Juvenile Instructor is the namesake of a publication intended as a catechism of Mormonism printed in Salt Lake City, Utah 1866–1930.

Salt Lake City, Utah's The Deseret News began producing a separate, LDS-themed newspaper insert on January 10, 2008 named Mormon Times. The website version of this insert features readers' feedback. The Mormon Times reporter covering the Bloggernacle is Emily W. Jensen. The Church of Jesus Christ of Latter-day Saints' own internet presence is substantial, and former Church spokesman Michael Otterson's blogging contributions featured prominently in the LDS blogosphere as well. Linescratchers, an LDS contemporary music scene blog, also debuted in 2008.

Neylan McBaine founded The Mormon Women Project in 2010.

The Church of Jesus Christ of Latter-day Saints established a blog at their Newsroom website in 2009. The Mormon Channel (now Latter-day Saints Channel) established a blog in 2014.

== Banner of Heaven hoax ==
From May 30, 2005 until just before Halloween of the same year, six bloggers carried out an elaborate and, ultimately very controversial prank through a fake blog called Banner of Heaven, a name derived from part of the name of a book of non-fiction by Jon Krakauer. Those involved in the prank were eventually exposed through a Bloggernacle-wide contest hosted at 9 Moons, another group blog. Although many people found the content on Banner of Heaven to be humorous, others found the deception to be very off-putting, and the Mormon blogging community engaged in multiple bouts of debate and protest over the ramifications of such a hoax. After seeing the extreme negative reaction, the perpetrators posted public apologies, although some of these were not well received by the community. As of 2010, the Banner of Heaven hoax continued to elicit strong debate whenever the subject was broached, and the hoax constituted one of the most important or defining events in the history of Mormon blogging.

Because of the controversy, the Banner of Heaven weblog was taken down and made not accessible until Scott B. of By Common Consent initiated a resurrection of the blog in order to conduct a five-year retrospective on the scandal. The blog was hosted for a time by MormonMentality.org, a group blog founded by David K. Landrith, one of the perpetrators behind the hoax.

== Blog portals ==
Numerous blog aggregators, or portals, have been constructed by participants in the Bloggernacle. The most prominent and widely recognized portal is the Mormon Archipelago (or MA), which was created in 2005 "to be a useful central place to see what's going on at all of the best blogs in the Bloggernacle." The MA displays Latter-day Saint-themed blogs, grouped together in various boxes or "islands", with the newest content in each blog on top, with sidebars displaying links to recent comments around the Bloggernacle. Over time, the location with the MA, removal of blogs, or addition of blogs has resulted in disputes over the role the MA plays in Mormon blogging.

In addition to the MA, other LDS Blog Aggregators include:

- MormonBlogs.org, an aggregator affiliated with the Mormon group weblog Mormon Matters.
- Mormon Blogosphere, an aggregator accepting any Mormon-related blog.
- LDS Blogs, a list of both LDS-themed blogs, as well as non-LDS-themed blogs by LDS bloggers.
- Nothing Wavering, a list of both LDS-themed blogs, as well as non-LDS-themed blogs by LDS bloggers.
- MOHO Directory, a list of blogs related to gay or lesbian or bisexual blogs of past, or present Mormons in any variety.

For many, these online networks focusing on religion and sexual orientation function as a family of choice—a committed relationship network bound by friendship rather than blood. Sociocultural psychologists Chana Etengoff and Colette Daiute suggest that online family of choice structures are characterized by members' access to and awareness of other individual members, dialogues about positive and negative experiences, empathy and relatedness, as well as unconditional group membership. Establishing supportive and validating systems of nonbiological relations is often imperative for LGBTQ persons as this can help facilitate relational resilience (i.e., providing and receiving social support), thereby buffering the impact of minority stress (i.e., tensions between majority and minority culture) and family of origin (birth) rejection. Such online mental health benefits seem to be LGBTQ specific; indeed, in contrast, many media scholars report that online engagement is generally associated with increases in anxiety, loneliness, and social isolation. It is possible that LGBTQ persons are more likely to benefit from online communications than heterosexual persons, as LGBTQ social networking is more focused on redefining cultural narratives and identity development. However, further research is still needed to determine if these online communication goals generalize to all members of the LGBTQ community or across online communication systems (e.g., Twitter, LinkedIn).

== Wheaties / Niblets ==
In 2005, the Mormon blogging community began giving out "Niblet Awards" (or just "Niblets") to recognize outstanding contributions to the bloggernacle. These awards were awarded on the basis of open nominations and voting, while the location of the awards and voting initially varied from year to year. The term "Niblet" was an homage to Hugh Nibley, one of the most distinguished and beloved Mormon scholars. Categories for the awards included "Best Big Blog", "Best Individual/Solo Blog", "Best Post", "Best Humorous Post", "Best Blog Design", "Best Overall Blogger", and numerous others. The Niblets often caused arguments and disputes within the bloggernacle, as there were frequently disagreements over which blogs should properly be considered members of the "bloggernacle community" and which blogs were simply Mormon-themed. Consequently, in 2011 there were no awards. In 2013 Wheat and Tares created the Wheaties and Tareific awards, picking up where the Niblets left off. Wheat and Tares discontinued the Wheaties and Tareific awards in 2018.

=== Wheaties / Niblet winners ===
The host site for the 2009 Niblet awards, Mormon Matters, compiled records of past winners as part of the awards. Among the winners were:

Best big blog

- 2005: Times and Seasons and By Common Consent (tie)
- 2006: By Common Consent
- 2007: By Common Consent
- 2008: By Common Consent
- 2009: By Common Consent
- 2010: By Common Consent
- 2012: Feminist Mormon Housewives
- 2013: Feminist Mormon Housewives
- 2014: By Common Consent
- 2015: By Common Consent
- 2016: By Common Consent
- 2017: By Common Consent

Best group blog

- 2005: Nine Moons
- 2006: Zelophehad's Daughters
- 2007: Zelophehad's Daughters
- 2008: Segullah
- 2009: Segullah
- 2012: Doves and Serpents
- 2013: Rational Faiths
- 2014: Wheat and Tares
- 2015: Wheat and Tares
- 2016: Wheat and Tares
- 2017: Wheat and Tares

Best solo blog

- 2005: Dave's Mormon Inquiry
- 2006: Dave's Mormon Inquiry
- 2007: (N/A)
- 2008: Keepapitchinin
- 2009: Keepapitchinin
- 2012: Keepapitchinin
- 2013: Keepapitchinin
- 2014: Flunking Sainthood
- 2015: Flunking Sainthood
- 2016: (N/A)
- 2017: (N/A)

Best overall blogger

- 2005: Wilfried Decoo
- 2006: Wilfried Decoo
- 2007: Kevin Barney
- 2008: Ardis Parshall
- 2009: Tracy M
- 2010: Ardis Parshall
- 2012: Hawkgrrrl
- 2013: Winterbuzz
- 2014: Julie Smith
- 2015: Hawkgrrrl
- 2016: Hawkgrrrl
- 2017: Angela C

== See also ==
- Cyberchurch
- #DezNat – an alt-right Twitter hashtag and community
- Foundation for Apologetic Information & Research
- List of family-and-homemaking blogs

People

- Heather Armstrong
- Elna Baker
- Joanna Brooks
- John Dehlin
- C. Jane Kendrick
- Neylan McBaine
- Adam S. Miller
- Stephanie Nielson
- Ardis Parshall
- Scot and Maurine Proctor
- Larry L. Richman
- Daniel C. Peterson
