= Municipal broadband =

Internet service from local governments

Municipal broadband is broadband Internet access offered by public entities. Services are often provided either fully or partially by local governments to residents within certain areas or jurisdictions. Common connection technologies include unlicensed wireless (Wi-Fi, wireless mesh networks), licensed wireless (such as WiMAX), and fiber-optic cable. Municipal fiber-to-the-home networks are becoming more prominent because of increased demand for modern audio and video applications, which are increasing bandwidth requirements by 40% per year. The purpose of municipal broadband is to provide internet access to those who cannot afford internet from internet service providers and local governments are increasingly investing in said services for their communities.

== Wireless public networks ==
Wireless public municipal broadband networks avoid unreliable hub and spoke distribution models and use mesh networking instead. This method involves relaying radio signals throughout the whole city via a series of access points or radio transmitters, each of which is connected to at least two other transmitters. Mesh networks provide reliable user connections and are also faster to build and less expensive to run than the hub and spoke configurations. Internet connections can also be secured through the addition of a wireless router to an existing wired connection – a convenient method for Internet access provision in small centralized areas. Although wireless routers are generally reliable, their occasional failure means no Internet availability in that centralized area. This is why companies now use mesh networking in preference to hub and spoke configurations.

Municipalities deploy networks in several ways. The five primary municipal broadband design approaches include:

- Full service (e.g., Chattanooga, Tennessee)
- Open access (e.g., Utah)
- Dark fiber (e.g., Stockholm, Sweden (also open access))
- Incremental expansion (e.g., Santa Monica, California)
- Private-public partnership (e.g., Westminster, Maryland)

Three basic models for the operation and funding of Wi-Fi networks have emerged:

- Networks designed solely for use by municipal services (fire, police, planners, engineers, libraries, etc.). Municipal funds are used to establish and run the network;
- Quasi-public networks for use by both municipal services and private users owned by the municipality but operated for profit by private companies ("private hot spots"). Such networks are funded by specially earmarked tax revenues then operated and maintained on a chargeable basis by private service providers;
- Private service providers using public property and rights of way for a fee. These allow for in-kind provision of private access to public rights of way to build-out and maintain private networks with a 'lease payment' or percentage of profits paid to the municipality.

== Backhaul and wired infrastructure ==
In Stockholm, the city-owned Stokab provides network infrastructure through dark fiber to several hundred service providers who provide various alternative services to end users. Reggefiber in the Netherlands performs a similar role. The Utah Telecommunication Open Infrastructure Agency provides service at one network layer higher through a fiber network. This system's capacity is wholesaled to fifteen service providers who in turn provide retail services to the market. A final model is a provision of all layers of service, such as in Chaska, Minnesota, where the city has built and operated a Wi-Fi Internet network that provides email and web hosting applications. These different models involve different public-private partnership arrangements, and varying levels of opportunity for private sector competition.

Some municipalities face the struggle of acting as host sites for broadband infrastructure, but not having access themselves to the services it provides. For example, Mendocino County, California, has acted as a cable landing site that connects the United States to Japan ever since the Cold War period, when the site was moved to the remote area from San Francisco for security purposes. Since ISPs do not prioritize areas like Mendocino Country which are not highly profitable for them, the area's proximity to necessary cable infrastructure has historically had little to no impact on the quality and availability of service in the area, which is still largely underserved to this day.

== Advantages and disadvantages ==
Supporters and opponents often assess municipal networks based on the supposed impact that the network will have on the local economy. Because of significant financial interests on either side of the issue, there is a variety of academic literature that supports and rejects the feasibility of a municipal network from an economic perspective.

Because municipal networks are publicly managed, they often lack the same profit incentive that private providers do. Proponents use this fact to argue that municipal broadband offers better prices, more equitable service, and increased competition in the broadband marketplace, in part because it is treated like a utility. Opponents argue that municipally run networks violate free speech rights outlined in the United States Bill of Rights.

=== Price ===
Proponents of municipal broadband describe how such networks can provide high-speed internet at lower rates than incumbent private internet service providers, with some municipalities even offering service for free at the point of connection. Opponents argue however that such networks are not actually cheaper to consumers when costs like the higher costs of construction, higher cost of maintenance, and tax subsidization that occurs with publicly managed utilities are factored in.

=== Competition ===
Proponents of municipal broadband also argue that the entrance of a public provider into a local market increases the competition which reduces prices and improves the quality of service. Opponents argue that the publicly funded networks have an unfair financial advantage that actually crowds out private investment and leads to long-term reduction in competition and problems associated with monopolization.

=== Equitable Service ===
Because of the different incentives and financing mechanisms that public providers have, municipal broadband has been marketed as a way of closing the digital divide by building more internet infrastructure in rural and low-income areas that private providers have historically avoided. Opponents argue that there is no evidence that municipal broadband increases adoption of the Internet. They also argue that the funding spent on operating a public provider results in serious levels of waste that would have been better otherwise spent on subsidizing experienced private providers to offer service in rural and low-income areas.

== Support ==
In a 2004 White House report, President George W. Bush called for "universal, affordable access for broadband technology by the year 2007" and "plenty of technology choices when it comes to purchasing broadband".

In 2000, the Federal Communications Commission endorsed municipal broadband as a "best practice" for bringing broadband to underserved communities.

In 2021, President Joe Biden attempted to include direct provisions for municipal broadband in his $1 trillion infrastructure bill.

The city of Philadelphia had the nonprofit Wireless Philadelphia accept bid from Earthlink to set up a network in 2004. "Philadelphia’s expectations were high; the city was eager, optimistic and, by the end of the decade, altogether too quick to chalk Wireless Philadelphia up as a failure. Still, the project was critical in laying the groundwork for future endeavors. Some of the hardware is still in use for an emergency communications network."

The Free Press, the Media Access Project, and the ACLU have all come out in favor of municipal broadband.

== Opposition ==
The increasing prominence of municipal broadband has led to opposition. Critics argue that the construction and implementation of broadband service is an inappropriate use of public funds that can be invested elsewhere, and that on some occasions (such as EPB and iProvo), the high cost of maintaining the network is passed onto residents via either taxes or exorbitant rates, for services that may not necessarily meet the quality or reliability of a commercial ISP. In an op-ed, Larry Irving stated that "private sector ownership generally is more effective and efficient, promotes innovation, and helps assure freedom of speech and open networks". Trump administration FCC commissioner Michael O'Rielly argued that governments were infringing on their residents' First Amendment rights via prohibitions on "hateful" or "threatening" speech in the acceptable usage policies for their broadband networks—even though these restrictions are general, boilerplate terms also used by commercial ISPs.

Lobbying efforts are often conducted by existing commercial ISPs, which promote state-level legislation—often based on a model act drafted by the industry and distributed by the conservative lobbying group American Legislative Exchange Council (ALEC)—that seek to frustrate the deployment or expansion of municipal broadband networks. These can include requiring that cities hold a referendum to seek approval, instituting regulatory burdens on the approval process or their operations (including requiring competing bids from private entities), restricting municipal broadband providers from expanding outside of their jurisdiction, restricting them to only being a wholesale provider for private entrants, prohibiting municipal broadband in cities above a certain population, and restricting access to utility poles (thus requiring underground digging, which can be costlier), among others. This pattern of state resistance to municipal broadband networks is supported by the 2016 Circuit Court precedent Tennessee v. FCC.

The successful campaign to hold a referendum on municipal broadband in Fort Collins, Colorado was opposed by the Colorado Cable Telecommunications Association (which included incumbent Comcast), who spent nearly $1 million on lobbying efforts, and the Colorado Chamber of Commerce, which was backed by CenturyLink and Comcast. Groups backed by the Koch brothers, including the Internet Freedom Coalition, and the Taxpayers Protection Alliance, have also been involved in lobbying efforts against municipal broadband projects.

As of 2023, 16 states currently have laws that restrict or frustrate the establishment of municipal broadband networks. In May 2023, Colorado passed a bill to lift a law requiring referendums for municipal broadband networks; the bill received bipartisan support.

== Finance ==
In support of U.S. government agencies attempting to deploy broadband services more widely, the Bill and Melinda Gates Foundation detailed the cost estimates of providing "fiber optic connectivity to anchor institutions" in the United States in 2009. The institutions considered in the 2009 report were public schools, public libraries, hospitals and community colleges, with an estimated total cost of US$5–10 billion.

On February 17, 2009, the American Recovery and Reinvestment Act was passed in an effort to build the economy, assist in job creation and retention, and improve U.S. infrastructure. The Act allocated $4.7 billion to establish a Broadband Technology Opportunities Program as part of the National Telecommunications and Information Agency State Broadband Data and Development Grant Program. A portion of funding awards were allocated to extending and developing broadband services to reach rural and "underserved areas," as well as improving broadband access for public safety agencies.

In July 2010. the District of Columbia was awarded $17.4 million in federal funds for its DC-Community Access Network.

In 2010, the NTIA awarded a $126.3 million grant to West Virginia in order to improve the state's broadband infrastructure. The grant was particularly intended for public facilities such as hospitals, libraries, and schools. However, a report from West Virginia's legislative auditor suggested that the state had misused the stimulus money, and wasted an estimated $7.9–15 million on purchasing high-capacity Cisco routers that were often installed in smaller facilities which did not require such extensive network capacity. Governor Earl Ray Tomblin established a task force to investigate the overspending. In January 2014, the NTIA rejected a proposal by the State to use the remaining $2.5 million (plus other funding, including credits from Cisco for returning the oversized routers) to fund a middle mile network, for not reaching "programmatic requirements" and missing a deadline for its use.

== United States policy ==
The Federal Communications Commission (FCC) has addressed the question of whether a municipality was an "entity" under the Telecommunications Act which mandates that "No State or local statute or regulation, or other State or local legal requirement, may prohibit or have the effect of prohibiting the ability of any entity to provide any interstate or intrastate telecommunications service." 47 USC 253(a). The legal question revolved around whether a state could prevent a municipality, as its subordinate government body, from entering the telecommunication market. In the case of Nixon v. Missouri Municipal League (2004), the U.S. Supreme Court concluded that a municipality was not an entity under the Telecommunications Act of 1996 and that a state could determine what authority its own subordinate jurisdictions had.

The 2014 case Verizon Communications Inc. v. FCC contained a ruling that the FCC had the jurisdiction to preempt state laws that restrict municipal broadband providers from extending their service beyond their current boundaries. In February 2015, the FCC voted to assert this jurisdiction to challenge municipal broadband laws in North Carolina and Tennessee, citing authority under Section 706 of the Telecommunications Act of 1996 to encourage the expansion of broadband by using "measures that promote competition in the local telecommunications market, or other regulating methods that remove barriers to infrastructure investment." The FCC declined to appeal.

== Examples from outside the United States ==
The Dutch capital, Amsterdam has its own municipal broadband project called: “Citynet Amsterdam.” This project is a partnership between the city and private investors that provides fiber cables to 40,000 buildings in the city.

The European Commission has made broadband internet access a priority as part of its "Europe 2020 Strategy." Other objectives include 30 Mbit/s of Next Generation Networks coverage or more for all citizens and 100 Mbit/s or more for 50% of households by 2020. By 2025, the European Commission has goals to provide access to 1 Gbit/s for all schools, transport hubs, and main providers of public service, accessed to upgraded download speeds of 1 Gbit/s for all European households, and uninterrupted 5G wireless broadband coverage for all urban areas and major roads and railways.

Different system models are more popular than others depending on the needs of the region. One example is "publicly run municipal network model" In this system, the local government installs and runs the broadband system. These systems are particularly common in Nordic countries.

== See also ==
- Switched mesh
- Wireless community network
- Municipal wireless network
- Open-access network is where a neutral party runs the physical infrastructure, and third-parties can connect customers to the wider Internet
