= Stephanie Nielson =

American Latter Day Saint blogger

Stephanie Aurora Clark Nielson
- Born: Stephanie Aurora Clark; June 27, 1981 (age 45)
- Occupations: Mother, Housemaker
- Spouse: Christian Nielson
- Children: Claire, Jane, Oliver, Nicholas, Charlotte, and Minnie
- Relatives: C. Jane Kendrick
- Writing career
- Pen name: NieNie
- Language: English
- Notable awards: Blogluxe Most Inspiring Blog 2009
- Website: www.nieniedialogues.com

Stephanie Nielson is a Latter-day Saint mommy blogger, burn survivor and until 2021 author of the blog "The NieNie Dialogues". She is also the younger sister of another popular blogger, C. Jane Kendrick.

== Plane crash and recovery ==
In 2008, Nielson was in a serious plane crash with her husband Christian and burned over 80% of her body. She was in a coma for three months and then underwent many operations, skin grafts, and physical therapy in a painful, ongoing treatment regimen. Her recovery process led to a large increase in publicity including interviews with Oprah Winfrey, Today, and a popular YouTube "Mormon Message" video for the Church of Jesus Christ of Latter-day Saints.

A year after her accident, she hiked the "Y", a rocky path near her parents' house, with her family and dozens of fans to demonstrate how far she had come.

== Blogging style, fanbase, and appeal ==
Nielson is known for her positive approach to life, especially motherhood, influenced in part by her strong religious convictions. Her fans credit her with inspiring them to become better mothers and for "portraying motherhood as a celebration, not a grind" as well as "...'the highest calling on earth: a job full of color and vibrancy and of the utmost importance.'"

As with many other Mormon mommy bloggers, Nielson attracted attention for her large base of readers who are either not Latter-Day-Saints, not mothers, or both. A Salon article entitled "Why I Can't Stop Reading Mormon Housewife Blogs", by Emily Matchar, a self-described "young, feminist atheist who can't bake a cupcake" but is "addicted" to several Latter-Day-Saint housewife blogs, including Nielson's, examined this interesting phenomena.

"So why, exactly, are these blogs so fascinating to women like us -- secular, childless women who may have never so much as baked a cupcake, let alone reupholstered our own ottomans with thrifted fabric and vintage grosgrain ribbon?...to use a word that makes me cringe, these blogs are weirdly "uplifting." To read Mormon lifestyle blogs is to peer into a strange and fascinating world where the most fraught issues of modern living -- marriage and child rearing -- appear completely unproblematic. This seems practically subversive to someone like me, weaned on an endless media parade of fretful stories about "work-life balance" and soaring divorce rates and the perils of marrying too young/too old/too whatever.".

In response, MMB (Mormon Mommy Blogs) argued that although the article was right that these blogs provided something missing in other people's lives, this missing piece was spiritual.

"We told the producer that it's easy to learn about people through their blogs. You are getting to peek inside their homes, you are getting to see how other people are living. And not only that, but those Mormons, that you've only heard weird myths about, are out there, talking, and you're finding, that they are regular people. These are regular women, who[m] you admire. These are people just. like. you.
Some of them stay at home, some of them work. But they do it all with a grace and greater understanding of their purpose...
When we write about our personal struggles, we do so in a respectful and uplifting way. Yes, we struggle with depression. Yes, we argue with our husbands. Yes, our children even drive us nuts.... But through all of that, the readers of Mormon mommy blogs feel the love...
Mormon Mommy Bloggers are a powerful force for good in this world, and they are spreading that goodness by sharing their lives through their blogs. "

This interpretation would likely be close to Nielson's own, as she noted on a Latter-Day-Saint radio interview, among other places that she felt her readers were reaching the spirit of God through her writings. Blogging is highly popular (and officially encouraged) among Latter-Day-Saints as a way extending the Latter-Day-Saint community and of spreading the divine word, and the resulting community of Latter-Day-Saint blogs has come to be known as the Bloggernacle.

On 22 February 2021, Nielson wrote a post on her blog titled 'Recede in Priority' in which she indicated that she would be giving up blogging and occasionally posting on Instagram. However, that decision apparently was short-lived, as she resumed blogging just two days later.

== Projects and causes ==
Nielson has supported a variety of projects and causes. She promotes the Church of Jesus Christ of Latter-Day-Saints and sends a copy of The Book of Mormon to any reader who requests it. Politically, Nielson campaigned for and encouraged her blog readers to support Mitt Romney in the 2012 US presidential election.

Nielson published her first book, Heaven is Here, in the spring of 2012.

She spoke at the World Congress of Families IX.
