= Mstar =

Mstar may refer to:

- MStar Semiconductor, a Taiwanese semiconductor manufacturer
- MSTAR, a battlefield radar manufactured in the United Kingdom by Thales
- Mstar (Internet service provider), a Utah internet service provider
- mStar (Malaysian web portal), a Malaysian news and web portal
