= Mommy blog =

Blogs authored by women about family and motherhood

"Mommy blog" is a term for blogs authored by women that are writing about family and motherhood, a subset of blogs about family-and-homemaking. These accounts of family and motherhood are sometimes anonymous. In other cases, women will achieve a sort of social media or blogger celebrity status through their digital life writing. Mommy blogs are often considered to be a part of the mamasphere. Mommy blogging can take place on traditional blogging platforms as well as in microblogging environments like those of popular social media sites (Twitter, Facebook, and Tumblr).

== History ==
While mommy blogs have been around since the early 2000s, the term did not have a widespread use until closer to 2010. The exact dates for the emergence of this word are hard to establish because of the nature of the blogosphere. The use of the word mommy blog, grew in popularity in 2002 after Melinda Roberts founded a blog called "The Mommy Blog" to later appear on the Oprah Winfrey show and popularize the concept. Heather Armstrong, who created her "Dooce" blog in 2001, has also been regarded as one of the first and most popular mommy bloggers. In 2009, Dooce and Melinda Roberts were noted for being well known mommy bloggers. The exact number of blogs that can be classified as mommy blogs is also hard to determine because of the large number of total blogs, which reaches over 150 million. But one way to trace the prevalence of the term moving into the 21st century can be traced through the increasing number of panels focused on mommy blogs at the annual women’s blogging conference, BlogHer. These blogs were immensely popular, as mainstream media "pushed an idealized, often misogynistic version of motherhood" and left mothers feeling isolated; these blogs flourished into active communities shaped by their shared experiences.

== Reactions ==
Mommy blogs are received in numerous ways. Some women bloggers are uninterested in being classified as mommy bloggers because they feel that men who occasionally write about family life and children are not automatically clustered into a group based on just that kind of content. Other women like Alice Bradley proclaim that mommyblogging is a radical act because it pushes motherhood into the public sphere through the digital. May Friedman writes that "mommyblogs gave [her] a response to the story of motherhood told from the outside and instead showed [her] motherhood and mothers, from within." Freidman’s scholarship suggests that mommy blogs reconfigure the narrative in which motherhood exists. When considering mommy blogs collectively they have led to an emergent shift in the story of motherhood and the role of mothers. Mommy blogs have been viewed as presenting numerous ways of thinking about motherhood that reject stereotypical depictions of mothers and women.

== See also ==
- Momfluencers
- Mormon blogosphere
- List of family-and-homemaking blogs
