= List of family-and-homemaking blogs =

Family-and-homemaking blogs are weblogs that feature commentary and discussions especially about home, family, and parenting. Appellations in media reports of "mom blog," "dad blog," "parenting blog" and "family blog" refer to blogs of this type. Businesses seek to run advertising for household items and children's merchandise on blogs of this type. The greater proportion of authors of blogs of this type are women.

== Lists ==
=== Notable mentions in the media ===
- Michelle Obama made her first of several blog entries at the group weblog BlogHer on July 17, 2008; all of her posts on this site were its "Mommy & Family" section.
- Elizabeth Edwards, wife of 2008 Democratic presidential candidate John Edwards, responded to criticism, originating in the online parenting (or "mom") blog Strollerderby, of Edward's children's accompanying her at campaign appearances.
- Katie Couric blogged on a multi-author parenting blog New York City Moms Blog prior to her interview of 2008 Republican vice presidential candidate Sarah Palin.

=== Notable writers ===
- Jenny Lawson, also known as 'The Bloggess'
- C. Jane Kendrick, C. Jane, Enjoy It
- Heather Armstrong, "Dooce"
- Laurie Puhn, "Expecting Words"
- Lylah M. Alphonse, "Write. Edit. Repeat.", In the Parenthood", "Child Caring", "The 36-Hour Day", and elsewhere
- Ree Drummond, "The Pioneer Woman"
- Nell Minow, "Movie Mom" (motto: "A parent's eye on media, culture, and values")
- Paula Spencer (journalist)
- Robert Rummel-Hudson, "Schuyler's Monster" ("A father's journey with his wordless daughter")
- Teresa Strasser, "Exploiting My Baby" ("Because it's exploiting me")

=== Notable websites ===
- Babble.com
- Brainhell (anonymously written, terminal medical-condition and family blog)
- Green Hour Blog
- Momlogic
- Parenting (magazine)

== See also ==
- BlogHer
- Feminist Mormon Housewives
