= List of people from Salt Lake City =

A person who lives in or comes from Salt Lake City, Utah is known as a Salt Laker. The following list contains well-known current or former Salt Lake City residents.

== Born in Salt Lake City ==
- Maude Adams (1872–1953), Broadway stage actress noted for her title role in Peter Pan
- Tony Anselmo (born 1960), Disney animator, voice of Donald Duck (1985–present)
- John T. Axton (1870–1934), first chief of chaplains of the United States Army
- Lee Barnes (1906–1970), pole vaulter, gold medalist in 1924 Olympics
- Roseanne Barr (born 1952), actress, comedian
- Bob Bennett (1933–2016), U.S. senator from Utah, son of Wallace F. Bennett
- Wallace F. Bennett (1898–1993), U.S. senator from Utah, father of Bob Bennett
- Jaime Bergman (born 1975), actress, former Playboy Playmate
- Justin Braun (born 1987), soccer player
- Wendy Burch (born 1969), KTLA-TV news reporter
- Mac Carruth (born 1992), ice hockey goaltender
- Neal Cassady (1926–1968), influencer of the Beat movement
- Roy Castleton (1885–1967), major league baseball player
- William Henry Chamberlin (1870–1921), philosopher and theologian
- Nathan Chen (born 1999), figure skater
- Clayton M. Christensen (1952–2020), professor at Harvard Business School
- Walter P. Chrysler (1875–1940), lived in Salt Lake City working as a railroad mechanic before making Chrysler automobiles
- Lee Cowan (born 1965), CBS News correspondent
- Cytherea (born 1981), pornographic actress, born in Salt Lake City and raised in West Valley City
- Matthew Davis (born 1978), actor
- Bryan Dechart (born 1987), actor, raised in Novi, Michigan
- Jack Dreyer (born 1999), MLB player for the Los Angeles Dodgers
- Patrick Fugit (born 1982), actor
- John Fulton (born 1967), writer
- John W. Gallivan (1915–2012), newspaper publisher
- Viola Gillette (1871–1956), comic opera singer, contralto
- Faye Gulini (born 1992), professional snowboarder
- W. Dan Hausel (born 1949), hall of fame martial arts grandmaster, geologist, writer
- William "Big Bill" Haywood (1869–1928), labor leader
- Whitney Wolfe Herd (born 1989), founder of the dating apps Tinder and Bumble
- Derek Hough and Julianne Hough, entertainers
- Larry Ivie (1936–2014), comic artist and writer
- Steve Konowalchuk (born 1972), NHL player
- Art Laboe (1925–2022), disc jockey, songwriter, record producer, and radio station owner, generally credited with coining the term "oldies but goodies"
- Joi Lansing (1928–1972), actress and singer
- Keith Larsen (1924–2006), actor
- Trevor Lewis (born 1987), NHL player, first Utah-born Stanley Cup champion
- Ted Ligety (born 1984), professional alpine ski racer, two-time Olympic gold medalist, and entrepreneur
- Zach Lund (born 1979), skeleton racer
- John Calder Mackay (1920–2014), founder of Mackay Homes, known for developing mid-century modern homes
- Daya Mata (1914–2010), president of the Self-Realization Fellowship and Yogada Satsang Society of India
- Mick Morris (born 1978), musician, Eighteen Visions
- William Charles Morris (1874–1940), political cartoonist
- Claude Rex Nowell, aka Corky King (1944–2008), founder of Summum
- Louis R. Nowell (1915–2000), Los Angeles City Council member, 1963–77
- Carol Ohmart (1927–2002), actress, Miss Utah 1946 and Miss America finalist
- Ralph Olsen (1924–1994), NFL player
- Tenny Palepoi (born 1990), NFL player
- Philip J. Purcell (born 1943), businessman
- Deon Nielsen Price (born 1934), pianist, composer and educator
- Natacha Rambova (1897–1966), costume and set designer, Egyptologist
- Gary Ridgway (born 1949), serial killer
- G. Ott Romney (1892–1973), third football head coach at Brigham Young University
- Milton Romney (1899–1975), college and pro football player, University of Texas basketball coach, cousin of Michigan Gov. George W. Romney
- Cael Sanderson (born 1979), only four-time undefeated collegiate wrestling champion in NCAA Division I history; 2004 Olympic gold medalist in freestyle wrestling
- Sky Saxon (1937–2009), founder and frontman to 1960s psychedelic rock group, The Seeds
- Frances Schreuder (1938–2004), socialite and convicted murderer
- Elizabeth Smart (born 1987), activist
- Dave Smith (born 1947), former NFL player
- Joe Smith (1935–2026), member of the Oregon House of Representatives
- Oliver G. Snow (1849–1931), politician
- Wallace Thurman (1902–1934), writer
- Pete Van Valkenburg (born 1950), NFL player
- Craig Venter (1946–2026), geneticist and entrepreneur
- George Von Elm (1901–1961), golfer
- Robert Walker (1918–1951), actor, star of Strangers on a Train
- Loretta Young (1913–2000), actress, Academy Award winner

== Native born and long-time residents of Salt Lake City ==
- Linda Bement (1941–2018), Miss Utah USA 1960, Miss USA 1960, Miss Universe 1960
- Frank Borzage (1894–1962), film director
- Wilford Brimley (1934–2020), character actor
- Ralph Vary Chamberlin (1879–1967), biologist, ethnographer and historian
- Paul W Draper (born 1978), mentalist and magician
- David C. Evans (1924–1998), pioneer of computer graphics; founder of the computer science department at the University of Utah; co-founder of Evans & Sutherland
- Richard Paul Evans (born 1962), author, best known for the Michael Vey series of books
- Gordon B. Hinckley (1910–2008), president of the Church of Jesus Christ of Latter-day Saints
- Thomas S. Monson (1927–2017), president of the Church of Jesus Christ of Latter-day Saints
- Frank Moss (1911–2003), U.S. senator representing Utah (1959–1977)
- Kim Peek (1951–2009), savant
- Vernon B. Romney (1924–2013), attorney general of Utah 1969–77, gubernatorial candidate
- Ken Sanders (born 1951), antiquarian bookseller
- Charlotte Sheffield (1936–2016), Miss Utah USA 1957, Miss USA 1957 (succeeded)
- Peggy Wallace (1943–2020), Utah state representative
- John Warnock (1940–2023), computer scientist and co-founder of Adobe Systems Inc.
- David Zabriskie (born 1979), professional road bicycle racer

== Non-native long-time Salt Lake City residents, present or former ==
- Maurice Abravanel (1903–1993), influential Utah Symphony conductor
- Darr H. Alkire (1903–1977), Air Force brigadier general, Stalag Luft III POW
- Heather Armstrong (1975–2023), blogger, dooce.com
- Belladonna (born 1981), pornographic actress
- Jackie Biskupski (born 1966), politician, mayor of Salt Lake City 2016–2020
- Walter P. Chrysler (1875–1940), lived in Salt Lake City working as a railroad mechanic before making Chrysler automobiles
- Alistair Cockburn (born 1966), computer scientist noted for agile software development
- Reed Cowan (born 1972), journalist
- Roma Downey (born 1960), Irish actress, singer, and producer, star of TV series Touched by an Angel
- W. Mont Ferry (1871–1938), former Salt Lake City mayor (1915–1919) and founder of Anti-Mormon American Party
- Lily Eskelsen García (born 1955), vice-president of the National Education Association
- Brandon Flowers (born 1981), frontman and lead singer to chart topping alternative rock band The Killers
- Tan France (born 1983), fashion designer, television personality, and author
- Jake Garn (born 1934), U.S. senator representing Utah (1974–1993)
- Tyler Glenn (born 1983), frontman and lead singer to Provo-based alt pop band Neon Trees
- Jared Goldberg (born 1991), professional alpine ski racer
- Jesse Grupper (born 1997), Olympic rock climber
- George C. Hatch (1919–2009), cable television pioneer
- Orrin Hatch (1934–2022), U.S. senator representing Utah (1977–2019)
- Ammon Hennacy (1893–1970), anarchist organizer
- James Irwin (1930–1991), Apollo 15 lunar module pilot
- Ken Jennings (born 1974), Jeopardy! champion
- Cameron Latu
- Karl Malone (born 1963), basketball player for Utah Jazz (1985–2003)
- Post Malone (Born 1995), Grammy-nominated rapper, singer, songwriter, and record producer
- Lee Mantle (1851–1934), U.S. senator from Montana
- Robert "Bobby" McFerrin, Jr. (born 1950), vocalist and conductor
- James Merendino (born 1969), filmmaker, SLC Punk!
- Ritt Momney (born 1999), singer
- Blake Moore (born 1980), U.S. representative
- Stevie Nicks (born 1948), singer-songwriter, best known for her work with Fleetwood Mac
- Dick Nourse (born 1940), television news anchor (1964–2007)
- Burgess Owens (born 1951), U.S. representative, former professional football player
- Robert Redford (1936–2025), founder of the Sundance Film Festival, Sundance Channel
- Nick Rimando (born 1979), former goalkeeper for Real Salt Lake; won the MVP Award after Real Salt Lake won MLS Cup 2009; academy coach at the Real Monarchs academy in Herriman, Utah
- Lenore Romney (1908–1998), former First Lady of Michigan and U.S. Senate candidate, mother of Mitt Romney; raised in Salt Lake City
- Harold Ross (1892–1951), journalist and founder of The New Yorker magazine
- Karl Rove (born 1950), deputy chief of staff to President George W. Bush
- Wallace Stegner (1909–1993), Pulitzer Prize-winning novelist and nature writer
- John Stockton (born 1962), basketball player for Utah Jazz (1984–2003)
- Ivan Sutherland (born 1938), computer scientist, Internet pioneer and co-founder of Evans & Sutherland
- Amanda Swenson (1852–1919), Swedish-born American soprano singer and teacher; directed the Salt Lake Ladies' Chorus
- Kenechi Uzor, Nigerian-born writer
- Edgar A. Wedgwood (1856–1920), adjutant general of the Utah National Guard
- Terry Lee Williams (born 1950), first African American to serve in the Utah State Senate
- Brigham Young (1801–1877), founder of Salt Lake City, president of the LDS Church
- Steve Young (born 1961), NFL quarterback for the San Francisco 49ers and Tampa Bay Buccaneers
