= Keepapitchinin =

American history blog by Ardis E. Parshall

Keepapitchinin, the Mormon History blog
- Website type: Mormon history and related studies single-author weblog
- Available in: English
- Creator: Ardis E. Parshall
- Website: Keepapitchinin.org
- Launched: 2008
- Current status: Active

Keepapitchinin is a history blog written by American historian Ardis E. Parshall, who specializes in Mormon history. The site was founded in 2008, whose namesake comes from a humorous newspaper published sporadically between 1867 and 1871 and was pseudonymously written by George J. Taylor, Joseph C. Rich, and Heber John Richards (the fathers of whom each served at the time as apostles in the Church of Jesus Christ of Latter-day Saints. Parshall received an award in 2010 for her Keepapitchinin essay "Beards" from the Association of Mormon Letters and was awarded by the Bloggernacle as 2010 Best Blogger and 2008, 2009, 2012, and 2013 Best Solo Blog. Parshall's article "'Pursue, Retake & Punish’: The 1857 Santa Clara Ambush" received the 2005 Dale L. Morgan Award of the Utah State Historical Society.

From 1993 until 2013, Parshall provided extensive professional research, editorial and administrative assistance to fellow independent historian William P. MacKinnon in delving through Utah-based records archives, especially in reference to the U.S. military expedition known in the mid-19th century the "Mormon Rebellion" and locally within the then State of Deseret as "Johnston's Army." In addition to assisting MacKinnon, Parshall has supplied her research to Matthew Grow, W. Paul Reeve, Nathan Oman, and Steven C. Harper.

According to a 2019 Salt Lake City Tribune article, over the years Keepapitchinin's content "has appeared, unattributed, in newsletters, magazines, blogs, books and other volumes. Several 'stolen posts' were abbreviated versions of papers Parshall presented at professional meetings, including the Mormon History Association." Historian Matthew Grow stated "perhaps the best biographical writing on international Mormons resides on Ardis Parshall’s blog Keepapitchinin."

== See also ==
- Mormon blogosphere
