= Lewis Billings =

American politician

Mayor of Provo, Utah
- In office January 6, 1998 – January 5, 2010
- Preceded by: George Stewart
- Succeeded by: John Curtis

Personal details
- Born: Lewis Kevin Billings; 1956 (age 69–70)
- Party: Republican
- Education: Brigham Young University

Lewis Kevin Billings (born 1956) is an American politician who served as mayor of Provo, Utah from 1988 to 2010.

== Education ==
Billings studied engineering, technology and business at Brigham Young University (BYU).

== Career ==
He rose through the ranks and was eventually appointed General Manager at CalDisk, a manufacturer and world-wide distributor of rotating memory storage devices for computer systems. In 1983 he joined IDC, a leasing company for commercial facilities, where he served as president and managing partner.

As a member of the Church of Jesus Christ of Latter-day Saints (LDS Church), Billings was a missionary in Japan as a young man. Later in life, he was served as president of the Provo Utah Central Stake from 1991 to 2000.

From 1995 to 1998 Billings was the Chief Administrative Officer in Provo where he also directed community and government relations for the city. He was also active in civic and local community organizations, including the Provo/Orem Chamber of Commerce, the Utah Valley Manufacturers Council, the Boy Scouts of America Provo District, and Utah's Fourth District Judicial Nominating Commission. Active in the Utah Republican Party, Billings was a delegate at four Republican National Conventions and was one of five United States Presidential electors from Utah in 2000 and 2004.

=== Mayor of Provo ===
Billings campaign for mayor of Provo in 1998 was endorsed by the previous mayor, George Stewart. During his mayoral term Billings pushed for the development of iProvo and the transformation of the old Brigham Young Academy campus into the library at Academy Square. Billings was also known for maintaining the city's policy of closing municipal facilities on Sunday. Some of his other mayoral activity included work on the Utah Lake Commission, Provo Municipal Airport improvements, participation in the 2002 Winter Olympic Games, local economic development, and celebrating Provo's sesquicentennial in 1999.

As mayor he worked on local boards and commissions, including the Salt Lake Organizing Committee for the 2002 Winter Olympic Games, the Utah Municipal Power Agency, the Utah County Clean Air Commission, the American Public Power Association, the United States Conference of Mayors Standing Committee on Energy and Environment, and as chairman of the Utah State Quality Growth Commission.

Billings' final term as mayor ended in January 2010, and he was succeeded by John Curtis.
