= Tennessee v. FCC =

US Court of Appeals 6th Circuit ruling

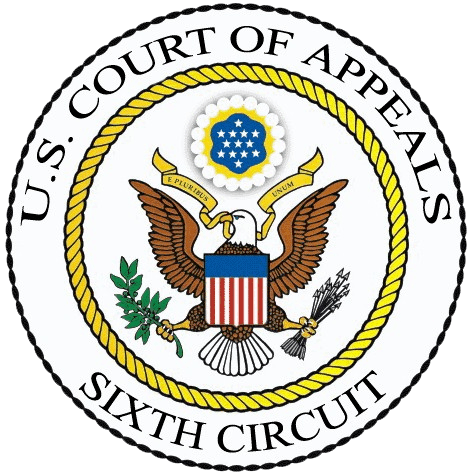
- Court: United States Court of Appeals for the Sixth Circuit
- Full case name: State of Tennessee, State of North Carolina v. Federal Communications Commission
- Decided: August 10, 2016
- Citation: 832 F.3d 597

Case history
- Prior actions: Adjudication by the FCC preempting Tennessee and North Carolina from enforcing anti-expansion statutes.

Case opinions
- Majority: John M. Rogers, Joseph M. Hood; Dissent in part: Helene White

Laws applied
- Telecommunications Act of 1996

Tennessee v. Federal Communications Commission, 832 F.3d 597 (2016), was a ruling of the United States Court of Appeals for the Sixth Circuit, holding that the Federal Communications Commission (FCC) does not have the authority to preempt states from enforcing "anti-expansion" statutes that prohibit local municipal broadband networks from being expanded into nearby communities.

== Background ==
In the early 2010s, Chattanooga, Tennessee, and Wilson, North Carolina, developed taxpayer-funded and non-profit municipal broadband networks. Chattanooga's operated in tandem with its electrical network, while Wilson's was an extension of a network that had originally connected city government buildings. Both networks demonstrated economic benefits for the cities, and in both cases nearby communities requested that the municipal networks be extended beyond city limits.

Chattanooga was prevented from extending its network beyond its city limits by a Tennessee state law that prohibited municipal electricity service providers from providing Internet service outside of their service territories. Wilson was prevented from expanding its network by a North Carolina law that imposed onerous financial requirements on that type of geographic expansion. Such statutes are often called "anti-expansion" or "anti-municipal" laws, and they are typically descended from regulations that protected exclusive cable TV franchises within a given city.

== FCC adjudication ==
Chattanooga and Wilson both petitioned the FCC to override the respective state laws in the interests of providing broadband service to underserved communities that had been neglected by major telecommunications firms. In a 2015 adjudicative hearing, the FCC ruled that the state laws acted as barriers to entry that prevented municipal networks from competing with commercial telecommunications providers (if any were present in the territory). The Commission cited Section 706 of the Telecommunications Act of 1996, which enabled it to promote advanced telecommunications services and to remove barriers to competition and investment in that market; the commission also claimed that it could regulate that market per the commerce clause of the U.S. Constitution.

Thus, the FCC concluded that it had the authority to preempt the anti-expansion laws in Tennessee and North Carolina, which would allow the planned expansion of Chattanooga's and Wilson's municipal broadband networks into nearby communities. The two states appealed this ruling to the United States Court of Appeals for the Sixth Circuit, which heard the case in 2016.

== Circuit Court opinion ==
The Sixth Circuit reversed the FCC's adjudicative ruling, and found that Section 706 of the Telecommunications Act of 1996 did not provide the authority to preempt state laws on matters that were not covered in corresponding federal laws. The Circuit Court held that there were no federal laws, including the 1996 Act, that dictated the geographic areas that municipal broadband providers must or must not serve. Such decisions could be made by local governments, unless their states claimed police power to make decisions on behalf of their cities or counties, as had both Tennessee and North Carolina.

The circuit court also cited a Supreme court precedent, Nixon v. Missouri Municipal League, in which the high court ruled that the FCC did not have the authority to preempt a state law on a different matter because that matter had not been addressed specifically in the 1996 Act. Per that precedent, the FCC must have received specific instructions from the U.S. Congress on the matter at hand in order to preempt any state law. Since the 1996 Act contained no precise instructions on adjudicating the geographic limits of municipal broadband service providers, the FCC did not have the authority to preempt the anti-expansion laws in Tennessee and North Carolina.

== Impact ==
As a result of the Sixth Circuit ruling, Chattanooga and Wilson were prohibited from expanding their municipal broadband networks to nearby communities that had requested connections, though those communities were not prevented from developing their own municipal networks if they wished. However, deciding whether such projects were in the public interest was left to states. Furthermore, governmental processes in several states including Tennessee and North Carolina, and those states' authority over decisions made by cities, conflicted with the FCC's attempts to support municipal broadband networks in underserved areas.

The ruling established a procedural precedent in which it is now assumed that the FCC cannot preempt state laws on any matter unless that matter is expressly covered in the Telecommunications Act of 1996. The conflict between this interpretation, and the FCC's statutory mandate to facilitate the development of advanced telecommunications networks, has generated scholarly dispute. Researchers have argued that state anti-expansion laws are an advantage for commercial telecommunications firms who have lobbied for protection from non-profit competition, even in localities that they have refused to serve.

It has been argued that the ruling in Tennessee v. FCC has held back the deployment of broadband Internet service in rural areas, and some urban areas, that have been neglected by commercial providers, which in turn has had a negative impact on commerce and education in such communities. Since the ruling, more states have enforced anti-expansion laws at the behest of commercial telecommunications firms, preventing a city's municipal network from expanding to nearby areas that need broadband service, and some states have enforced prohibitions the development of taxpayer-funded networks altogether even if commercial firms have shown no interest in those communities.
