= Ariel Bybee =

American opera singer

Ariel Bybee (January 9, 1943 – March 20, 2018) was a mezzo-soprano who has had a distinguished career as a soloist, voice teacher and university opera director. According to Opera News (June 2000), she was "a prominent mezzo at the Metropolitan Opera for eighteen seasons." She sang over 460 performances at the Metropolitan Opera.

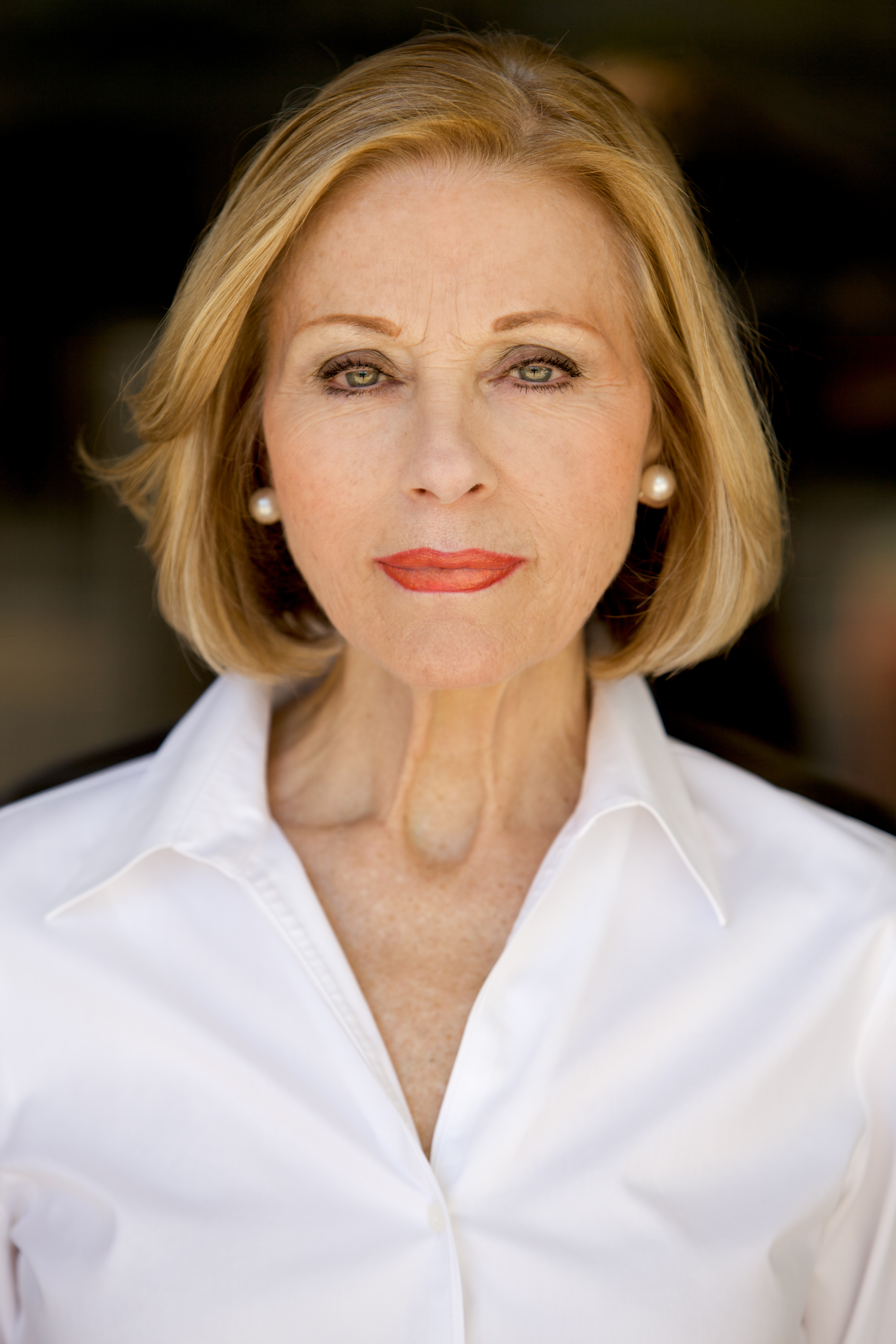
Ariel Bybee, Mezzo Soprano

Bybee received a bachelor's degree from Brigham Young University in 1965. She later took advanced musical studies in New York where one of her voice teachers was Cornelius L. Reid. Bybee was an alumna of the Music Academy of the West where she attended in 1969.

Bybee was a member of The Church of Jesus Christ of Latter-day Saints and has soloed with the Tabernacle Choir. At the 2001 dedication of the Winter Quarters, Nebraska Temple Bybee sang a solo.

== Performance history ==
Bybee sang at the Met in every season from 1977 to 1995. She first earned accolades at the Met for her performance as Jenny the whore in Rise and Fall of the City of Mahagonny when she replaced Teresa Stratas on very short notice. Details of these performances can be found in the MET archives. The review by the New York Times, said that “Mahagonny” is not the answer to 20th-century opera". The themes of pleasure, prostitution, debauchery, particularly with respect to the role of Jenny, were controversial but also resonated with themes of excess and exaggeration expressed by well-known popular musicians such as David Bowie in the 1970s. In the play itself, Jenny is seen waiting on multiple men who have lined up for her services and in other portions of the play, men argue over the price to spend a night with her. Further acclaim came from her performances as Annio in the Met's premiere of Mozart's La clemenza di Tito.

Bybee has sung numerous leading roles at the Met including Hansel in Hänsel und Gretel, Niclausse in Les contes d'Hoffmann and Suzuki in Madama Butterfly. She also sang the role of Alisa on the 1982 Met telecast of Lucia di Lammermoor with Joan Sutherland. She made her highly successful debut at the Washington, D.C. Opera in a new production of Menotti's The Consul and her European opera debut as Melisande at the Sofia Music Weeks in Bulgaria. She made her debut with the Vienna Philharmonic (Lorin Maazel, conducting) in a concert performance of Elektra at Carnegie Hall.

Bybee's professional talents were discovered by Maestro Maurice Abravanel of the Utah Symphony and later by Kurt Herbert Adler of the San Francisco Opera. Adler invited Bybee to sing in San Francisco for several seasons, during which she appeared in many roles, including the title roles in Carmen, Musetta in La bohème and Inez in La favorita.

She first performed on the East Coast when she sang the title role of Monteverdi's Coronation of Poppea at the Tanglewood Music Festival. In the spring of 1985, Bybee appeared on stage with the New York City Ballet in its production of Songs of the Auvergne, and she debuted at the Ravinia Festival in Elektra conducted by James Levine. She made her debut in Kuhmo, Finland in Pergolesi's Stabat Mater and Vivaldi's Gloria.

== Teaching history ==
Before making her debut with the San Francisco Opera Company, Bybee taught junior high school music for five years, first in Utah and then in California.

Starting in 1993, Bybee began teaching private students in her New York studio, as well as teaching both at the Lee Strasberg Institute and the American Musical and Dramatic Academy in New York City.

For ten years, she was Artist-in-Residence and associate professor of Voice at the University of Nebraska–Lincoln, teaching voice and directing operatic productions. In 2007, she and James E. Ford co-directed the University of Nebraska−Lincoln's production of Frank Loesser's The Most Happy Fella, which won the International Trophy (Grand Prize) in competition at the Waterford International Festival of Light Opera. When she left in 2008, the university established the Ariel Bybee Visiting Professorship Endowed Fund.

When she became an emerita professor at the University of Nebraska–Lincoln, the university endowed the Ariel Bybee Chair of Opera Performance in her honor. In 2008, Bybee moved to the Salt Lake City area where she taught voice at the University of Utah.

== Recordings ==
Bybee can be heard in Franco Zeffirelli's 1983 motion picture of La traviata, singing the role of Flora. As well as being heard on numerous Live from Lincoln Center telecasts, Bybee has recorded two solo albums: O Divine Redeemer and Eternal Day.

== Personal life ==
From 1972 to 1996, she was married to John Neylan McBaine. They divorced in the latter year. Bybee was married to James E. Ford, a professor of English, in 1998. Ford was at the University of Nebraska–Lincoln, which is what prompted her to join the faculty there. She and Ford first had met and dated when they were both teenagers. She has a daughter, Neylan McBaine, and three grandchildren.

Bybee proactively used her musical skill to advance the goals of the Church of Jesus Christ of Latter-day Saints of which she was a member. She often performed at the Washington DC Temple Visitors Center, especially at events where Ambassadors were invited. She performed several solos with the Mormon Tabernacle Choir.

== Publications ==
- The Modern Singing Master: Essays in Honor of Cornelius L. Reid. Edited by Ariel Bybee and James E. Ford. Lanham, MD & London: Scarecrow Press, 2002. ISBN 0-8108-4241-6

== Sources ==
- OperaNews official web site
- The Metropolitan Opera Archives
