= Feminist Mormon Housewives =

- Website type: Group blog about contemporary Mormon culture and women's issues
- Available in: English
- Creator: Lisa Butterworth (fMhLisa)
- Website: feministmormonhousewives.org
- Launched: August 2004
- Current status: Active

Feminist Mormon Housewives (fMh) is a group blog, podcast, and Facebook group featuring commentary and discussion on contemporary Mormon culture and women's issues. According to The New York Times, "Unlike the more mainstream Mormon blogs—known collectively as the Bloggernacle—that by and large promote the faith, this online diary focuses on the universal challenges of mothering young children and on frustration with the limited roles women have in the Church of Jesus Christ of Latter-day Saints."

== History ==
Feminist Mormon Housewives was founded by Lisa Butterworth, a wife, mother of three, active member of the Church of Jesus Christ of Latter-day Saints (LDS Church), Sunday School teacher, and Democrat living in Boise, Idaho, along with four of Butterworth's friends. During the 2004 American presidential election, Butterworth felt she couldn't discuss her liberal, feminist politics in her local LDS social circle. She found online discussions by critics of the LDS Church, but disliked their angry tone. When she stumbled up on an article on liberal Mormons at the Times & Seasons blog, she found that civility and openness could be maintained. This inspired Butterworth to contribute to the growing Mormon blogging community, called the Bloggernacle, by creating Feminist Mormon Housewives, with the tagline "Angry Activists with diapers to change" (this was later changed to "A safe place to be feminist and faithful"). fMh provided a place to focus on women's issues, such as abortion, education, polygamy, parenting, and Mother in Heaven.

The blog's atypical premise drew attention from others in the Bloggernacle, then throughout the mainstream media. The role it served in the online Mormon community was the subject of a 2006 session at a Sunstone Symposium.

The site was originally operated at Blogspot by Butterworth and her liberal niece-in-law Beth. The number of regular contributors eventually grew to a widespread group of women from England, New York City, Australia, Massachusetts, Missouri, Idaho, and Utah. Some notable figures in Mormon studies have participated with fMh, including Laurel Thatcher Ulrich, Todd Compton, Margaret Toscano, and influential players in the Bloggernacle.

== Prominence ==
fMh is recognized as one of the top Mormon blogs and often featured at Mormon Archipelago and Mormon Blogs, both LDS blog aggregators, and in Bloggernacle coverage at the Mormon Times. Discussion of the blog has been featured in The New York Times, Newsweek magazine, National Public Radio, Bust (the feminist magazine), and the Salt Lake Tribune.

== See also ==
- Mormon feminism
- Culture of The Church of Jesus Christ of Latter-day Saints
