= Neylan McBaine =

American writer and marketer (born 1977)

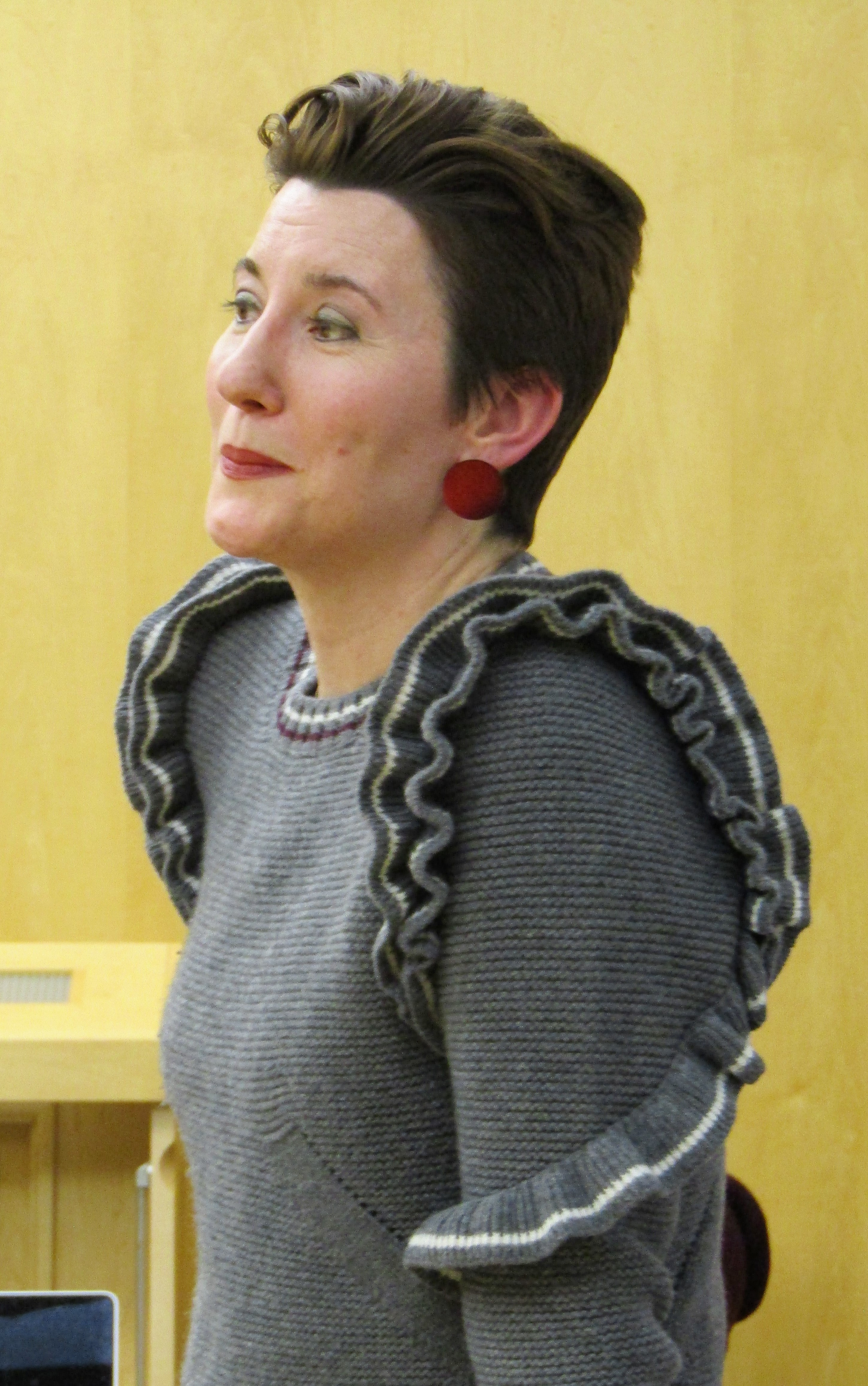
- Neylan McBaine in 2019
- Born: 1977 (age 48–49); Manhattan, New York
- Education: Juilliard School (High school music program); Yale University
- Spouse: Elliot Smith
- Children: 3
- Relatives: Ariel Bybee (mother) Jock McBaine (Father); John Francis Neylan (great-grandfather)
- Website: www.neylanmcbaine.com

Neylan McBaine (born 1977) is an American writer and marketer. As a writer, she focuses on topics related to women in Mormonism (Church of Jesus Christ of Latter-day Saints). She has been published in Patheos.com, PowerofMoms.com, Newsweek, Dialogue: A Journal of Mormon Thought, Segullah, Meridian Magazine and BustedHalo.com.

She wrote How to Be a Twenty-First Century Pioneer Woman (2008) and Women at Church: Magnifying LDS Women's Local Impact (2014), and is the founder and editor-in-chief of The Mormon Women Project.

As a marketer, McBaine worked in Silicon Valley in digital marketing. In 2017, she co-founded Better Days 2020, a non-profit that popularizes Utah women's history through education, legislation and art.

== Biography ==
McBaine was born and raised in New York City. Her mother, Ariel Bybee McBaine, was a singer with the Metropolitan Opera and became known at the Met for her performance as Jenny the whore in Rise and Fall of the City of Mahagonny when she replaced Teresa Stratas on very short notice. Details of these performances can be found in the MET archives. The themes of pleasure, prostitution, debauchery, particularly with respect to the role of Jenny, were controversial but also resonated with themes of excess and exaggeration expressed by well-known popular musicians such as David Bowie in the 1970's. In the play itself, Jenny is seen waiting on multiple men who have lined up for her services and in other portions of the play, men argue over the price to spend a night with her.

Neylan spent much of her childhood at that location. She graduated from the Chapin School and studied piano at the Juilliard School in the high school extension student extension program. She then graduated from Yale University in English literature. Her father, Jock McBaine was an attorney.

As a newlywed after Yale, she moved to San Francisco, California and began working in public relations and marketing. Her husband's graduate studies then took them to Boston, Massachusetts. In 2009 they settled in Salt Lake City, and McBaine became creative director at Bonneville Communications where she worked on the "I'm a Mormon" advertising project.

McBaine self-published her first book in 2009, How to be a Twenty-First Century Pioneer Woman. In 2014, Greg Kofford Books published her book Women at Church: Magnifying LDS Women's Local Impact, which addressed tensions regarding the role of women in Mormon culture, and proposes possible solutions.

In 2010 McBaine founded the Mormon Women Project, a 501c3 nonprofit that collects and publishes interviews of Mormon women from various countries around the world. As a Mormon feminist, McBaine also advocated for LDS women to lead the church's refugee-assistance efforts. She was Chief Marketing Officer at Brain Chase Productions, maker of an online learning program for grade school students.

In 2017, McBaine co-founded Better Days 2020, a non-profit that popularizes Utah women's history through education, legislation and art. She is CEO of the organization, preparing Utah to celebrate the 150th anniversary of Utah being the first place a woman cast a legal ballot in the modern nation.

== Publications ==
Books

- McBaine, Neylan (2009). How to be a Twenty-First Century Pioneer Woman. Lexington, Kentucky: lulu.com. ISBN 978-0-557-05647-7.
- —— (2013). Sisters Abroad: Interviews from the Mormon Women Project. Englewood, Colorado: Patheos Press. ISBN 9781939221179.
- —— (2014). Women at Church: Magnifying LDS Women's Local Impact. Salt Lake City: Greg Kofford Books. ISBN 978-1589586888.

Articles

- McBaine, Neylan (Winter 2007). "Seeds of Faith in City Soil: Growing Up Mormon in New York City". Dialogue. 40 (4): 163–77.
- —— (Spring 2008). "Just Mom, Dad, and Me". Segullah. 4 (1).
- —— (Winter 2008). "A Spiritual Awakening Amid a Hippie Faith: [Review of On the Road to Heaven]". Dialogue. 41 (4): 195–98.
- —— (Fall 2012). "To Do the Business of the Church: A Cooperative Paradigm for Examining Gendered Participation Within Church Organizational Structure". Dialogue. 45 (3): 70–97. Archived from the original on 2018-07-26. Originally presented at the 2012 FairMormon Conference. Later published in Mormon Feminism: Essential Writings (Oxford University Press, 2016), pp. 257–62.
- —— (2015). "Finding the Waters of Mormon". In Jensen, Emily W.; McKay-Lamb, Tracy (eds.). A Book of Mormons: Latter-day Saints on a Modern-Day Zion. White Cloud Press. pp. 64–68. ISBN 978-1-935952-90-9.
- —— (2016). "Filling the Page: Women's Choices in the Context of Gospel Boundaries". In Holbrook, Kate; Bowman, Matthew (eds.). Women and Mormonism: Historical and Contemporary Perspectives. University of Utah Press. ISBN 978-1-60781-477-1.
- McBaine, Neylan (2016). "Latter-day Saint Women in the Twenty-First Century". In Hales, Laura Harris (ed.). A Reason for Faith: Navigating LDS Doctrine and Church History. Religious Studies Center, Brigham Young University; Deseret Book. ISBN 978-1-9443-9401-1.
- ——; Cassler, V.H. (Summer 2016). "What's in a Name? SquareTwo Poll Survey Results on the Naming of Women's Positions and Organizations in the LDS Church". SquareTwo. 9 (2).

== See also ==
- Mormon blogosphere
- Mormon feminism
