= C. Jane Kendrick =

American writer (born 1977)

- Born: Courtney Jane Clark; March 11, 1977 (age 49); Denver, Colorado, U.S.
- Education: Utah Valley State College (BS)
- Occupations: Homemaker– blogger and columnist
- Children: 4
- Awards: 2008 Best Major Blog, Weblog Awards
- Website: C. Jane, Enjoy It

Courtney Jane Kendrick (née Clark, born March 11, 1977) is a blogger, former Deseret News newspaper columnist and humorist who writes about her life and family on her blog, C Jane Enjoy It. Kendrick chose the title of her blog because she and her husband had struggled to conceive a child—it was her "response to well-meaning people who told her to enjoy her years of being childless."

Seeking partial anonymity, she goes by the name of "C. Jane" on her blog and calls her husband "Chup", her son "The Chief," but refers to her daughters by their real names: Ever, Erin, and Iris. Garnering a wide readership for her interesting and engaging writing style, the Phoenix New Times terms the personal nature of her writing poignant and earnest, while Halogen TV terms her writing "sarcastic and irreverent, but...honest."

Kendrick's sister, Stephanie Nielson, known as "Nie Nie" by followers of her blog, is also a well-known blogger and her fame played a big role in bringing the spotlight to Kendrick. After she and her husband Christian were injured in a small plane crash, Kendrick cared for three of the Nielson children, Claire, Jane and Ollie.

Kendrick sponsored downtown Provo's Rooftop Concert Series and announced the goal of posting on her blog every day until December 25, 2010.

In September 2018, Kendrick accused Robert Kirby, a Salt Lake Tribune columnist, of inappropriate behavior toward her at a Mormon conference in July. Kirby was suspended from the Salt Lake Tribune for three months without pay, following an internal investigation. Kendrick wrote she felt “belittled and embarrassed” after Kirby, 65, made sexually tinged comments and persuaded her to eat an edible dose of marijuana, then mocked her before a Sunstone Symposium audience by declaring Kendrick was “high.” Kirby issued a written apology stating he was "sorry that my actions have offended people" and acknowledged that there was some truth to the allegations.

== See also ==
- Bloggernacle
