= Get Off My Internets =

News website and discussion community focusing on internet celebrities

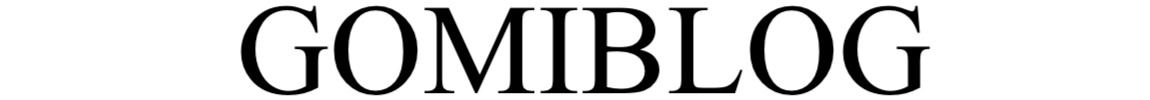

Get Off My Internets, also known as GOMI or GOMIBLOG, is a website devoted to critiques of online personalities, particularly bloggers. Founded by Alice Wright in 2009, GOMI is an anti-fan site that has a reputation for vicious criticism and cyberbullying.

== Description ==
In 2009, Alice Wright, a programmer in Brooklyn, began GOMI as a blog with multiple discussion forums. Wright has stated that the purpose of GOMI is to be a type of "quality control watchdog" where readers can provide constructive criticism to bloggers. Bloggers can screen negative comments and block posters; GOMI provided a means for readers to comment freely about online personalities "without being shut out", according to Wright. The forum forbids revealing private information about the bloggers being commented upon, as well as posts that plot to do harm or advertise for a blog.

GOMI had more than 10,000 forum members by 2013, and more than 50,000 active users a year later. In 2014, GOMI had more than 21 million pageviews and 500,000 unique visitors a month.

In addition to discussion forums, GOMI includes tabloid-style blog posts and a wiki to explain the website. The front page displays updates on recent content from popular bloggers. The forum for fashion bloggers had over 600 topics and over 100,000 posts by January, 2015. Popular discussion threads can contain hundreds of pages of posts. The GOMI perspective is that those who present themselves as public figures open themselves up to criticism. GOMI discussions can drive traffic to bloggers' sites, increasing their revenue.

When GOMI considered shutting down due to financial difficulties, forum members donated money to keep it going.

== Forum discussions ==
The focus of GOMI forums are lifestyle blogs, typically autobiographical and sometimes focused on specific areas such as travelling, parenting, fitness, and fashion. Forums are set up in categories for each type of blog, such as "Lifestyle Bloggers", "Mommy/Daddy Bloggers", and "Fashion/Beauty Bloggers". Within each forum, a thread is assigned to a specific blogger. Blogs reviewed on GOMI range from the most famous to little-known hobbyists. Community members often give themselves usernames that refer to memorable forum discussions.

Participants deconstruct bloggers' authenticity. Lifestyle bloggers are held to a high standard of authenticity by GOMI participants. Forum participants are critical of blogs that they consider to be promotional or fake, and call out lifestyle, food, travel, and health bloggers for what they consider to be poor advice, self-promotion, mysticism, and lack of authenticity. Wright is particularly offended by bloggers exploiting their children. One lifestyle blogger listed the types of things that the GOMI community would criticize about individual bloggers:

Personal finances. Mental health. Body Image. Divorce. Religion. Baby loss. Parental suitability. Bankruptcy. Job loss.

Commentators point out "humble brags" and "First World problems" in travel blogs. After criticizing one travel blogger for giving insufficient details about her romantic life in her blog, a screenshot of a Facebook post she posted was brought to the forum where participants compared what was written on Facebook to what was written in the blog; the inconsistencies that the forum participants perceived were taken as evidence that the blogger was performing her persona, rather than being authentic. The forum participants criticize monetization and personal branding, particularly when bloggers accept sponsors that are perceived to contradict the blogger's brand. A common criticism of travel bloggers is about their attempts to position their lifestyle as achievable without acknowledging social privilege factors such as class, race, and education.

One frequently criticized blogger said the criticism levelled at her on GOMI forums bothered her initially, but prompted her to disclose sponsored content. One of the bloggers most hated by GOMI participants is Dooce.

A forum named "Stay on My Internets" is where participants praise blogs and online personalities that they approve of.

== Reputation ==
GOMI has been described as a "destination for haters" and has a reputation for cyberbullying. Although GOMI claims to offer constructive criticism, critiques are often "articulated in a snide, cruel, or vitriolic way". GOMI passes judgement on who should speak online, on which topics, and in what manner. Heather Mallick describes GOMI as a "mean girls site" that viciously attacks female bloggers. Public outrage ensued when Forbes included GOMI in their list of "100 Best Websites for Women" in 2013. One blogger said she went to therapy as a result of harassment from GOMI. Those who stand up to the forum participants are often criticized as harshly as the bloggers, accused of "white knighting", and driven from the forum.

Several years after starting GOMI, The Daily Dot said Wright "might be the most reviled woman on the Web". Wright gets hate mail, death threats, anonymous calls, pressure on her advertisers, and threats of lawsuits. Wright has received criticism for the "cyberbullying" on GOMI, even a cease-and-desist letter.

== See also ==
- Micro-celebrity
- Kiwi Farms
