= Mstar (Internet service provider) =

- Industry: Fiber optics media
- Founded: Salt Lake City, Utah (1998)
- Headquarters: Murray, Utah; Orem, Utah
- Key people: Mark Wentzlaff, President
- Products: Internet, telephone, television service provider
- Website: Mstar.net

Mstar, originally headquartered in Murray, Utah and later relocated to Orem, Utah, was a fiber optic internet service provider in the state of Utah, USA. Mstar provided Internet, telephone (VoIP) and television services (IPTV) via fiber optics. Mstar was a provider of services over municipally owned backbones, namely the Utah Telecommunication Open Infrastructure Agency (UTOPIA) and IProvo.

== History ==
Launched in 1998 as Deseret Online by the Church of Jesus Christ of Latter-day Saints, Mstar began as a provider of value-added IP-based services to the Church’s educational institutions around the world.

In June 2002, the company was acquired by Chicago Venture Partners, L.P. (CVP) a private equity investment firm which specializes in buyouts, late stage growth equity investments and private investment in public equity (PIPES).

In June 2004, Mstar purchased Burgoyne Internet Services and nearly doubled its audience base. In March 2005, Mstar became the first company to launch services over the fiber to the premises (FTTP) network owned by UTOPIA.

In May 2009, Mstar was acquired by Prime Time Communications, a facilities based provider of IPTV, VoIP and Internet services in Denver, Colorado. Prime Time brought a much expanded HD lineup, MPEG4 video, updated IPTV middle-ware platform and in-house Broadworks VoIP platform.

== Services ==
- Internet: 15 to 50 Megabits per second upload and download speed 24/7 support
- Television: High-Definition IPTV
- Telephone: Unlimited local & long distance
