= Wilfried Decoo =

Flemish academic

Wilfried Decoo (born 1946) is a Flemish academic. He is a professor with the department of French and Italian at Brigham Young University and also a professor at the University of Antwerp. Decoo is also a contributor to the Mormon blog Times and Seasons.

Decoo has a B.A. from UFSIA (Antwerp Jesuit University, presently merged into University of Antwerp) and an M.A. from Ghent University. His Ph.D. is from Brigham Young University. Decoo is a convert to the Church of Jesus Christ of Latter-day Saints. Decoo has served multiple terms as the chair of the department of education at the University of Antwerp.

Among books by Decoo are Systemization in Foreign Language Teaching: Monitoring Content Progression (Routledge Research in Education) and Crisis on Campus: Confronting Academic Misconduct the later published by the Massachusetts Institute of Technology.
