= Kenechi Uzor =

- Nationality: Nigerian
- Period: 2016-present
- Education: University of Utah
- Occupation: Writer, Publisher
- Born: Nigeria

Kenechi Uzor is a writer and publisher from Nigeria. Since 2016, he has been based in the US.

== Early life and education ==
Uzor was a general manager at Farafina Trust, a subsidiary of Kachifo Limited, a publishing company in Lagos, Nigeria. He then left for the US, where he earned an MFA in creative writing from the University of Utah. At the same university, he enrolled for the Master's of Business Creation program.

In 2021, he graduated from the Denver Publishing Institute program.

== Career ==
In 2017, Uzor wrote about his experiences as a fresh migrant from Nigeria. He has also published fiction. In 2020, he started Iskanchi Press and has published a number of African authors including Angolan author João Melo.

== Awards ==
In 2023, Uzor was a finalist for the Independent Book Publishers Association's Innovative Voices Program.

== Personal life ==
Uzor lives in Salt Lake City, Utah. He is married.
