= CornerWorld =

CornerWorld Corporation. (CWRL)
- Company type: Public
- Industry: Direct Marketing, Technology, Telecommunications
- Founded: 2003
- Headquarters: Dallas Texas, United States
- Key people: Scott Beck-CEO, V. Chase McCrea-CFO, Marc Pickren-President and CMO, CMO
- Website: cornerworld.com

CornerWorld Corporation (CWRL:CWRL) is a microcap publicly traded company holding assets in direct marketing, telecommunications and technology. CornerWorld has headquarters in Dallas, Texas, as well as offices in Holland, Michigan, and New York, New York.

== History ==
CornerWorld was founded in 2003 as a social network service that provided a way for users to earn revenue from photos, music and videos posted to the site. Building off of an original product called Cornerband, CornerWorld evolved into platform for users to connect with one another using business manager services such as sending and receiving emails, live chats, interactive classified ads and invitations.

In May 2007, CornerWorld officially changed its name to CornerWorld Corporation, and in August of that year became a publicly traded company through a share exchange agreement with Olympic Weddings International, Inc., a tour company specializing in wedding packages for past Olympic Games cities. In September 2007, CornerWorld entered into a distribution agreement with Napster to increase the exposure to musicians on the site.

In April 2009, as a result of the acquisitions of Enversa Companies and Woodland Holdings, CornerWorld removed their social network from www.cornerworld.com, and rebranded the domain as the corporate website.

== Acquisitions ==
CornerWorld attempted to purchase Sway, Inc., a social media marketing company, but the deal was cancelled in May 2008 due to CornerWorld's inability to meet the financial terms of the arrangement. In September 2008, CornerWorld acquired Leadstream, LLC, a technology-oriented direct response marketing company that was founded by Marc Pickren. As part of the agreement, Leadstream, LLC merged with Enversa and now operates under the name Enversa Companies, LLC.

On February 23, 2009 CornerWorld completed the acquisition of Woodland Holdings, Ltd, which included Woodland Wireless Solutions, West Michigan Colocation Services, T2TV, Wireless Solutions, Visitatel and T2 Communications. This included acquisition of the 611 Roaming Service patent, which generates revenue by processing over 14 million calls from roaming wireless customers per year and seamlessly transferring them to their service provider. On March 30, 2011, CornerWorld announced that it had completed the terms of the Settlement Agreement with former Woodland Holding Ltd owner and CornerWorld Board member Ned Timmer.

== Corporate Leadership ==
Board of Directors

- Scott Beck: Chairman
- Marc Blumberg: Director
- Kelly Larabee Morlan: Treasurer, Secretary

== See also ==
- Emery Telcom
- Ultatel
