= Open-access network =

An open-access network (OAN) refers to a horizontally layered network architecture in telecommunications, and the business model that separates the physical access to the network from the delivery of services. In an OAN, the owner or manager of the network does not supply services for the network; these services must be supplied by separate retail service providers.

"Open Access" refers to a specialised and focused business model, in which a network infrastructure provider limits its activities to a fixed set of value layers in order to avoid conflicts of interest. The network infrastructure provider creates an open market and a platform for internet service providers (ISPs) to add value. The Open Access provider remains neutral and independent and offers standard and transparent pricing to ISPs on its network. It never competes with the ISPs.

== History ==
In the 20th century, analog telephone and cable television networks were designed around the limitations of the prevailing technology. The copper-wired twisted pair telephone networks were not able to carry television programming, and copper-wired coaxial cable television networks were not able to carry voice telephony. Towards the end of the twentieth century, with the rise of packet switching—as used on the Internet—and IP-based and wireless technologies, it became possible to design, build, and operate a single high performance network capable of delivering hundreds of services from multiple, competing providers.

== Value-added chain ==
The value chain in the OAN consists of three different layers or stages: the passive infrastructure, the active component and the services offered. There are three roles:

- the infrastructure provider (PIP) owns the passive infrastructure and maintains it.
- The network provider (NP) operates the active technical component and is usually its owner.
- The service provider (SP) provides the digital services.

There are different business models, depending on the role of the market players. The various players in the broadband value chain can take on different roles. The backbone PIP owns and operates the passive infrastructure of the backbone network and, to a certain extent, the area networks. This may be a public or private sector player with long-term investment plans or occasionally a local cooperative. The access area PIP owns and operates the “first mile” connections and, to a certain extent, the passive infrastructure in area networks. This may be a telecommunications operator, a housing association, a local cooperative, the owners of apartment buildings, the municipality or homeowners who also have long-term interests in the area. Service providers (SPs) can be small or large local or national companies that provide services to end users via an NP's network.

== Business models ==
The construction of broadband networks usually requires considerable investment, which often leads to a natural monopoly position of the operators. For this reason, various models have been developed over the years to promote competition between service providers and lower the barriers to market entry.

=== Passive-Layer Open Model (PLOM) ===
PLOM describes a model for the construction and operation of a passive infrastructure for broadband networks. In this model, the passive infrastructure is either built directly by an entity or by way of a contract award. Ownership of the passive infrastructure remains with the PIP (Passive Infrastructure Provider), which is also responsible for operation and maintenance.

The special feature of the PLOM model is that the broadband network is open at the passive level, which means that competing operators have direct access to end users via physical connections. There is a distinction between the backbone PIP and the local area PIP, where the backbone PIP is responsible for connecting the different parts of a region, county or municipality and the local area PIP is responsible for providing the local loops and sometimes the area network.

The PLOM model gives operators a high degree of freedom and control in the design of their access network, which is an advantage. A disadvantage, however, is that under this model, competing operators must install active technology in the access node of the area they wish to serve, unless a sharing agreement is reached. If the population density is too low, each access node aggregates only a small number of users, so that the presence of more than one operator in each area is not economically viable. This weakens competition and leads to high OPEX and CAPEX.

Overall, the PLOM model is best suited to relatively large and densely populated areas such as larger cities. In more sparsely populated areas, the 3LOM or ALOM model is often chosen instead, where competition between service providers is achieved through an open network at the active level to facilitate market entry. The PLOM model is often used by publicly maintained municipal networks in large cities, with the public sector assuming the role of backbone PIP. A prominent example of this model is Stockholm's fiber optic network.

=== Active-Layer Open Model (ALOM) ===
In contrast to the PLOM model, in which separate passive and active layers are operated by different entities, ALOM integrates both layers in one hand. This entity installs technology in all access nodes and sets up an open, operator-neutral network via which all service providers can deliver their services to all end users.

In the value chain of the ALOM model, the role of the backbone PIP and NP is in one hand. The backbone PIP+NP earns revenue from the service providers by delivering their services to the end users through its backbone network and to the subscriber lines that the backbone PIP+NP leases from the access area PIP and for which it pays a fee. End users receive their services from their chosen operator for a service fee. In some cases, the network fee is paid directly to the PIP+NP. The access area PIP can generate revenue by receiving payments from end users.

=== 3-Layer Open Model (3LOM) ===
In the 3LOM, the public sector is responsible for the role of the PIP, while the role of the NP is assigned to a single company that operates the active layer and establishes an open, operator-neutral network through which all service providers can deliver their services to all end users.

To ensure fair and non-discriminatory conditions for all SPs, the NP is not allowed to provide services itself.

=== Vertically integrated model ===
The vertical model describes an approach in which established telecommunications companies own the infrastructure and technology and offer services directly to end customers. They are usually also able to provide access to wholesale tiers that enable other service providers to gain access. It is a proprietary model where the telecom operator has significant market power and is able to grant its competitors access to the network in the physical layer or in the active layer.

Competing operators can either install their technology in the access node of the areas or install their network technology in a data center where it is coupled with the network owner. However, the disadvantage of this model is that it can lead to the telecoms operator assuming a monopolistic position and restricting competition. For this reason, some countries have rules that allow competitors to access the network in the physical layer or in the active layer in order to promote competition.

== Applications and experience ==
The OAN concept is appropriate for both fiber and WiFi access networks, especially where exclusivity cannot be allowed. The shared maintenance costs make it appropriate for rural areas, where traditional Internet service providers (ISP) may be reluctant to provide a service. Open access networks are also viewed as a feasible way of deploying next-generation broadband networks in low population density areas where service providers cannot obtain a sufficient return on investment to cover the high costs associated with trenching, right-of-way encroachment permits, and the requisite network infrastructure.

In contrast to traditional municipal networks where the municipality owns the network and there is only one service provider, the open access model allows multiple service providers to compete over the same network at wholesale prices. This allows service providers to make money in the short-term, and the municipality or cooperative to recoup its costs over the long-term. The build-out and infrastructure is typically financed through low-cost bonds.

=== United States ===
Open access networks have proven successful in parts of the United States initially as "middle mile" networks and more recently as "last mile" networks, Europe, and Asia. However, "last mile" OANs in the United States have begun to attract more interest as rural and suburban communities seek to catalyze economic development. One of the best known and most mature OANs is in Västerås, Sweden, a city of about 40,000 homes. The Västerås OAN has dozens of providers, and more than a hundred services available to users. During the past years a large number of OANs have spread all over Sweden, especially in smaller municipalities (see e.g. Säffle and Hudiksvall). In the US, open access networks like municipality owned The Wired Road in Virginia have been able to attract both local and regional service providers quickly. This has resulted in the cost of Internet access and telephone service for business users in The Wired Road service area to decline by fifty to seventy percent due to the increased competition between providers. This OAN provides open access transport to any service provider that meets minimum technical and financial qualifications, including allowing existing providers to supply enhanced services, however, it does sell services itself and therefore does not compete with private sector providers. The Utah Telecommunication Open Infrastructure Agency (UTOPIA) is a consortium of 20 Utah cities deploying and operating an open-access fiber network in Utah.

=== Australia, New Zealand, Singapore ===
New Zealand, Australia and Singapore also have open-access networks based on fiber to the home. In new Zealand Crown Fibre Holdings has been established to manage the Government's $1.5 billion investment in Ultra-Fast Broadband infrastructure. The Government's objective is to accelerate the roll-out of Ultra-Fast Broadband to 75 percent of New Zealanders over ten years. In Australia, the leading open-access provider currently is Opticomm, who have been delivering services to over sixty communities since the mid-2000s. Australia also has the recently formed government owned corporation NBN Co, who are creating the National Broadband Network to provide open-access fiber to the node at one gigabit per second for more than ninety-three percent of homes and businesses in the country, and fixed wireless and satellite technologies with a minimum speed of twelve megabits per second to the remainder of the population.

=== Austria ===
While Austria has made strides in broadband coverage, with open access network models gaining relevance in several federal states, the market is characterised by a fragmented landscape with a diversity of actors and approaches. There is an increasing engagement with OAN models, particularly the 3LOM model and the PLOM model.

=== Germany ===
The German fibre optic ecosystem involves various players, and OAN models are of growing importance. The NGA Forum has played a crucial role in standardising performance descriptions and process interfaces for wholesale operations, particularly in the area of interoperability.

=== Sweden ===
Sweden has a decentralised structure with numerous local fibre networks, often publicly owned, promoting competition and consumer choice. Stokab in Stockholm serves as a wholesale-only provider, offering Layer 1 (Dark Fiber) access, which has fostered a competitive market with various service providers. Standardisation has been partly achieved through collaboration with the industry association.

=== Switzerland ===
Swiss Fibre Network (SFN) also plays a significant role in aggregating demand and supporting the expansion of FTTH networks by local utilities.

=== Denmark ===
Denmark has seen significant FTTH deployment, with a mix of vertically integrated and wholesale models. While open access is mandated, market observers have noted delays in its implementation due to ongoing network investments and integration challenges.

=== Italy ===
The Italian government aims to establish a single national broadband infrastructure company. While the wholesale-only provider Open Fiber has been awarded concessions for publicly funded areas, the practical implementation has faced delays.

=== France ===
France has experienced substantial FTTH rollout, particularly in less densely populated areas (Zones d’Initiative Publique - ZiP). Regulatory interventions by ARCEP have facilitated passive co-location based on network architecture and precisely defined co-investment processes

== Challenges ==
These challenges focus on the existing Open Access Network models in Austria.

=== Standardisation Gaps ===
A central challenge is the current state of standardisation in Austrian OANs. While the need for standardisation of process interaction in wholesale is recognised, their development and consensus need to be broadened. There is a lack of a uniformly usable and implemented process interface for wholebuy. Existing solutions for process interaction are often specific to certain technologies (like FTTC) and not readily applicable to FTTH.

=== Competition Dynamics ===
Challenges exist concerning competition at both the Network Provider (NP) and Service Provider (SP) levels. In vertically separated models, the relationship between the NP and SPs is crucial, and issues like process handling and potentially discriminatory wholesale contracts can arise. In integrated NP + SP models, there is a potential conflict of interest where the integrated entity might not provide non-discriminatory access to other SPs, as observed in the FIS model.

=== Complexity of Multi-Stakeholder Collaboration ===
The involvement of many small and large NPs and SPs, as in the FIS model, can lead to complex processes and difficulties in reaching agreements and standardising interfaces. Differing product specifications among various NPs can create significant complexity for nationally operating SPs seeking a uniform product portfolio.

== Conclusion and Recommendations ==
The report strongly concludes that there is a need for industry-wide standardisation of product and process interfaces for accessing OANs in Austria. This standardisation should encompass both technical (Layer 1 and Layer 2) and business (commercial and operational aspects)

Drawing on the successful experiences of countries like Germany and France, the establishment of a national sector forum is recommended as the appropriate institutional framework for driving the standardisation process. The sector forum must include qualified representatives from all relevant market participants, including OAN operators, vertically integrated companies, service providers, municipalities, and potentially public authorities and funding agencies. The sector forum should invite foreign providers and platforms (e.g. Vitroconnect, SFN, Local Fibre Alliance and IFT).

== See also ==
- Access network
- Municipal broadband
- Rural Internet
- Local-loop unbundling
