= IProvo =

Fiber-optic network in Utah, US

iProvo is the name of the fiber to the home service in Provo, Utah. Provo's backbone connects homes and businesses throughout the city, as well as municipal buildings, schools, power stations, and traffic signals. Construction began in July 2004 and was completed within two years. With the exception of new subdivisions not included in the original build out contract, the fiber optic backbone is available in all areas of the city. The network's fiber optic equipment is manufactured by World Wide Packets.

iProvo was initially operated as a public-private partnership. The city owned and maintained the fiber optic lines and fiber optic equipment, while private companies provided television, telephone, and Internet services to homes and businesses. The network had two service providers: Mstar and Nuvont Communications/Veracity Communications. In 2008, the network was sold to Broadweave Networks. Provo deemed Veracity in default on its contract to buy the network after its security deposit fell below $1.6 million. It was given to Google in 2013 for their Fiber network by the city council.

== Development and launch of iProvo ==
In the late 1990s, a community task force was asked to review the work of technical and business consultants and to explore whether or not the city should build a telecommunication system. After several months of study, the committee recommended that the city move forward with the project.

A phased approach was proposed. Phase I would be the construction of three fiber rings throughout the city for internal city purposes. Phase II would be the Fiber to the Home demonstration project area to be launched in one Provo neighborhood. And Phase III would be a citywide deployment to every resident and business in Provo.

Phase I began in 2001, followed by a successful trial period in Phase II, and a citywide build out in Phase III. By December, 2006, only five months following completion of construction, 8,400 customers had subscribed to services offered over iProvo. The number of customers reached 10,000 in September, 2007.

== The wholesale model ==
At the outset, the recommendations of the community task force contemplated that the city would use what has come to be known as a "retail model." In this model, which is the model used by most municipal utilities across the country, the city delivers services directly to the customer.

But the retail model was challenged by incumbent providers in public settings and at the Utah State Legislature. As a result, iProvo uses what is now known as the "wholesale model." Under this scenario, the city builds the network infrastructure and then opens its network to retailers, who offer services across the network.

== Why fiber and not other technologies ==
The city considered a variety of other technology choices including wireless, broadband over power lines, and hybrid fiber-coax.

Fiber to the home clearly had advantages over hybrid fiber-coax, and a sharp decline in costs during the years from when the city first began to study the technology encouraged the city to build a fiber-to-the-home system. While the equipment on each end of the fiber would need to be changed out at regular intervals, studies showed that fiber technology would ensure a long-term future for the telecommunication project.

The city chose not to use wireless technologies because they are tenuous, affected by weather, and require line of sight between antennas for good connection, which is not always possible. Security was also an issue, and networks are often crowded and result in reduced bandwidth speed.

A fundamental mission of the city was to build infrastructure that would be for the long term and available to all residents. The incumbent regulated carriers had communicated to the city that the Provo market was low on priority lists for receiving a fiber network. The city felt confident that if a municipally owned network was not built that it would be a number of years before fiber technology would be available to Provo.

== Financial status ==
In late 2006, the Reason Foundation, a libertarian think-tank, issued a report characterizing iProvo as financially unstable and ineffective at lowering Internet costs or raising broadband use. Provo responded with a white paper challenging Reason's analysis and stating that any conclusions were premature since the full network had been in place for less than a year. In June 2007, "the Provo Municipal Council voted to add $1.2 million in sales tax revenue to the city's budget for the fiscal year 2008 to help iProvo pay off its debt." Additionally, "[t]he city's most recent projections show that iProvo will not be self-sustaining until at least 2011".

The Reason Foundation updated their analysis of the network on April 16, 2008, and found that iProvo's total losses are likely to exceed $10 million by the end of this fiscal year - and that figure doesn't include the $39.5 million borrowed to launch the project, most of which still needs to be paid back. The Reason Foundation report says Provo "faces the dilemma of continuing to fund iProvo with no break-even point in sight, or it can sell and recoup as much of its investment as it can.

== Proposed sale to Broadweave Networks ==
On May 6, 2008, Mayor Lewis Billings announced a proposed sale of the iProvo network to Broadweave Networks of Lehi, UT. This sale would allow Broadweave to be both the wholesale provider and the sole retail provider. Broadweave will purchase the network for $40.6M though a city-financed loan spread over 19 years. As part of the deal, ownership of the network reverts to the city of Provo should Broadweave become unable to make its payments on the loan. The loan is currently backed by a $6M letter of credit from Sorenson Capital but requires no up-front money on Broadweave's part.

On May 16, 2008, Broadweave Networks announced that it will buy out the current iProvo service providers.

Broadweave was then acquired by Veracity networks which has run the iProvo network since then, after negotiating a series of management contracts with the city of Provo.

=== Criticism of the proposed sale ===
Broadweave primarily has experience developing in new developments ("greenfields") whereas Provo is an "overbuild" or "brownfield" development delivering services to existing homes. Broadweave has little experience with sales and marketing since it has not been in competitive markets, something that caused the original exclusive retailer, HomeNet, to end up declaring bankruptcy.

Broadweave currently has less than 1100 customers and reported around 800 customers two years ago.

iProvo has 10,250 customers as of April 2008, nearly 10 times what Broadweave currently serves. The company also has aggressive expansion plans with applications open in Nevada, New Mexico, Arizona, and Texas. It is also rumored to be purchasing the defunct OEN FTTH system in Houston. Since these are capital-intensive projects, the company runs the possibility of burning through capital too quickly and folding.

Pete Ashdown, owner of XMission, has alleged that the RFP process did not clearly solicit offers to buy the network. Some other residents have also complained that the process has not been subject to enough public scrutiny.

Additional criticism has focused on the fact that Provo would again be responsible for the bond debt should Broadweave fail.

== Sale to Google ==
On April 17, 2013, the city of Provo and Google announced that Google would acquire iProvo's existing networks and make upgrades to reach gigabit per second speeds. Approved by the city council, Provo became the third city to receive Google Fiber, following the installation and operation of Google Fiber in Kansas City (including nearby Olathe, KS) and Austin, TX.

It was revealed Google acquired iProvo for $1, and agreed in exchange for completing installation and offering free 5 Mbit/s internet service to all households or businesses for 7 years, after a $30 setup fee.
