= Brainhell =

Brainhell (1963 – February 2, 2008) was the pen name of Brian Hill, an American journalist and poet who blogged closely and anonymously for four years about amyotrophic lateral sclerosis (ALS), the disease that eventually killed him. Hill never identified himself by his real name, and pictures he posted to the blog did not show his face; after his death, however, a full facial photo was posted on the front page of the blog.

Hill started the "brainhell" blog in December 2003, after he had first visited doctors about a mysterious set of symptoms that included his left arm and leg acting "lazy". He led readers through the complex rounds of medical tests, before his diagnosis with ALS on 13 January 2004.

Brainhell explained in a January 2005 interview with the San Francisco Chronicle that he began blogging to keep his family and friends informed about his condition, but moved to writing for a wider audience "in case other people diagnosed with ALS searched for a blog about having the disorder." Over the next four years, brainhell closely documented his life, family and philosophical inquiries, while measuring his own physical deterioration, often with mathematical precision.

Brainhell insisted on maintaining his confidentiality and his family's privacy. His real name was never publicly connected to the "brainhell" blog until after his death. Among other news sources, the San Francisco Chronicle published an obituary of Brian Hill. The San Francisco Chronicle did not, however, refer to the term "brainhell" or otherwise connect Hill to the "brainhell" blog. Hill was publicly revealed to be "brainhell" in this Wikipedia article.

Hill's posts grew shorter and his typing more tortured as the disease progressed, but he continued blogging even on his deathbed, noting his ups and downs with caregivers. The last blog post he placed himself was on 23 January 2008, addressed to his wife and children. The blog remained online as of May 2018.
