= XMission =

- Type: Private
- Industry: Internet service provider
- Founded: Salt Lake City, Utah, U.S. (October, 1993)
- Founder: Pete Ashdown
- Headquarters: Salt Lake City, Utah, U.S.
- Number of locations: 1 office, 1 data center (December, 2007)
- Area served: Worldwide
- Key people: Pete Ashdown (Founder, President)
- Services: Internet access Data center Web hosting service Email hosting Virtual private server Hosted PBX
- Owner: Pete Ashdown; Jan Ashdown
- Number of employees: 44 (December, 2007)
- ASN: 6315
- Website: XMission.com

XMission is the first and is one of the few remaining independent Internet service providers (ISP) in Utah, United States, founded in late 1993 by Pete Ashdown. Starting in 2003, the company began providing free wireless internet in public libraries and some local businesses. By the Summer of 2005, XMission worked out an agreement with Salt Lake City government to expand free wireless to many parts of downtown Salt Lake City, Utah. XMission also provides streaming support for radio stations, including NPR affiliate KCPW-FM and independent radio station KRCL.

XMission also provides free accounts to hundreds of non-profit organizations and sponsors many events, including the Utah Open Source Conference, the Living Planet Aquarium, the Living Traditions Festival, the Utah Arts Festival, and the Twilight Concert Series.

XMission has a policy of refusing requests by government agencies to monitor its customers without a warrant.

The company announced in late 2007 that it would be upgrading to 100% renewable energy, provided by Rocky Mountain Power's Blue Sky program. This makes XMission the first ISP in Utah to use entirely environmentally friendly power.

== See also ==
- The Best Page in the Universe, a popular site hosted on XMission's servers.
