= DC-Community Access Network =

The DC Community Access Network (District of Columbia Community Access Network) (DC-CAN) is a 100 gigabit middle mile network funded by the city of Washington, D.C. which will make broadband internet access available to over 250 health, educational, public safety, and other community anchor institutions. The network mainly focuses on underserved areas of the district.

== History ==
The project was estimated to cost $25 million and was partially funded by the American Recovery and Reinvestment Act of 2009, providing $17 million of federal grants, with the goal to provide affordable broadband Internet service to more than 250 community anchor institutions. The funding required the project to be completed by June 30, 2013

Construction broke ground in April 2011, and the network's first link was activated on 7 December 2011 connecting 24 institutions to the network. As of 2012, the city had laid more than 67 miles of fiber-optic cables.

== Criticism ==
The network has been criticised for relying on private companies to provide internet services to customers, as the network only provides the physical cabling for the internet, not the services themselves.
