= Heather Armstrong =

American blogger (1975–2023)

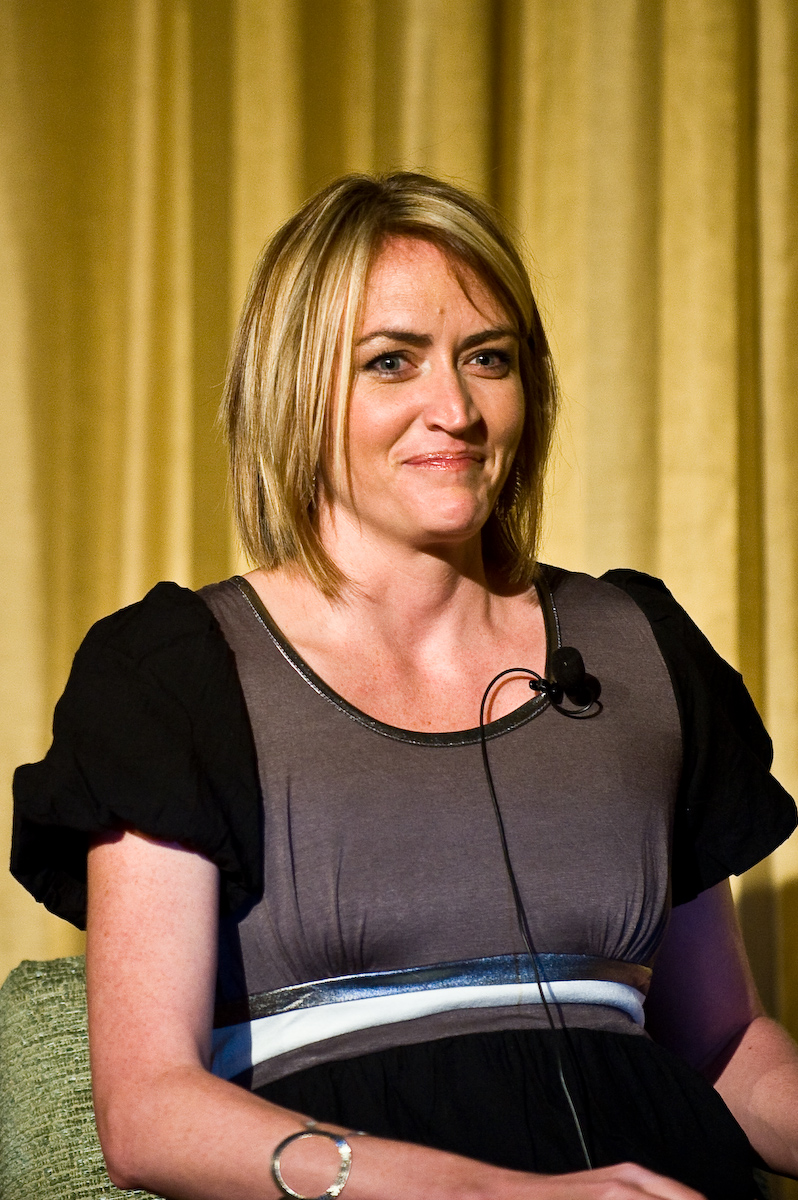
- Armstrong at the 2008 BlogHer conference
- Born: Heather Brooke Hamilton; July 19, 1975; Memphis, Tennessee, U.S.
- Died: May 9, 2023 (aged 47); Salt Lake City, Utah, U.S.
- Other name: Dooce
- Education: Brigham Young University
- Occupation: Blogger
- Years active: 2001-2023
- Spouse: Jon Armstrong (m. 2002; div. 2013)
- Partner: Pete Ashdown
- Children: 2
- Website: dooce.com

Heather Brooke Armstrong (née Hamilton; July 19, 1975 – May 9, 2023) was an American blogger and internet personality from Salt Lake City, Utah, who began writing under the pseudonym Dooce. She was best known for her website dooce.com, which peaked at nearly 8.5 million monthly readers in 2004 before declining due to various factors including the rise of social media; she had actively blogged from c. 2001 until her death by suicide in 2023.

== Early life ==
Armstrong was born Heather Hamilton in 1975 and raised in Bartlett, Tennessee. She was raised a member of the Church of Jesus Christ of Latter-day Saints (LDS Church) in Memphis, Tennessee. She majored in English at Brigham Young University (BYU) in Provo, Utah. She began having doubts about the Church and experiencing bouts of depression while a student in predominantly Mormon Utah. After graduating in 1997, she then left the Church and moved to Los Angeles, where she found work as a web developer for startups during the dot-com boom. She later returned to Salt Lake City to work as a consultant and designer.

== Dooce.com ==
Armstrong's pseudonym came from her inability to quickly spell "dude" during online chats with her former co-workers.

She started her blog in May 2001, and it cost Armstrong her job the following year after her coworkers discovered she had been writing about them. After her termination she continued it, focusing on her parenting struggles. It began running ads in 2004, and five years later she had 8.5 million viewers a month and was reportedly making over $100,000 annually from banner ads on Dooce. Armstrong appeared on Oprah and was featured by Forbes magazine among 30 honorees on its list of "The Most Influential Women In Media" for 2009.

She wrote extensively and humorously of her struggle with depression, hospitalization for mental health, pregnancies, parenthood, and experiences with the LDS Church. She had called the LDS-associated Brigham Young University one of the worst places that exists and said that she left the Church the day after she graduated since her diploma was withheld over a $20 unpaid parking ticket that she had incurred after being unable to find a legal parking spot for a mandatory church service.

Armstrong said the following about her site, dooce.com, which began in February 2001 with a post about Carnation Milk: "Since then I have published more than 5,300 entries covering topics such as breast milk pumps, golf cart rides with Norah Jones, and the one guy I dated who talked like Elmo during sex."

In 2004, Armstrong accepted text advertisements on her website for the first time, a decision that was controversial among her readership. The following year, Armstrong accepted graphic ads and wrote that the revenue from the advertisements would be her family's principal source of income while her husband made the transition to manage her advertising and business. Since then, she appeared in Suave advertisements that feature her own image and trademark. In 2009, Armstrong again received mass media attention for using Twitter to get her washing machine fixed.

By that year, ads visible to Dooce's 8.5 million monthly readers made a reported $40,000 for the Armstrongs each month, making it her primary source of income; she began running sponsored content as well. She appeared on Oprah and, along with Oprah herself, was included in Forbes' list of the 30 Most Influential Women in Media. In November of that year, Armstrong introduced a new, interactive section to her website that allows registered users to post questions and responses. Armstrong introduced this new section, the Dooce Community, by posting an entry on the main dooce.com page:

For a few years we've been trying to come up with a way for the readers of this site to connect and interact with each other, to get to know each other better, for me to get to know you better, and for little bunnies to fart sunshine. The comments section has sort of worked in this capacity, but not very well and not to the extent that it should. So we (meaning the team I introduced above) have put together a new section of this website where we can all pool our knowledge and experiences and drunken mishaps into one highly accessible and fun place.

Dooce.com received multiple nominations and awards from The Weblog Awards, including a lifetime achievement award for Armstrong in 2008.

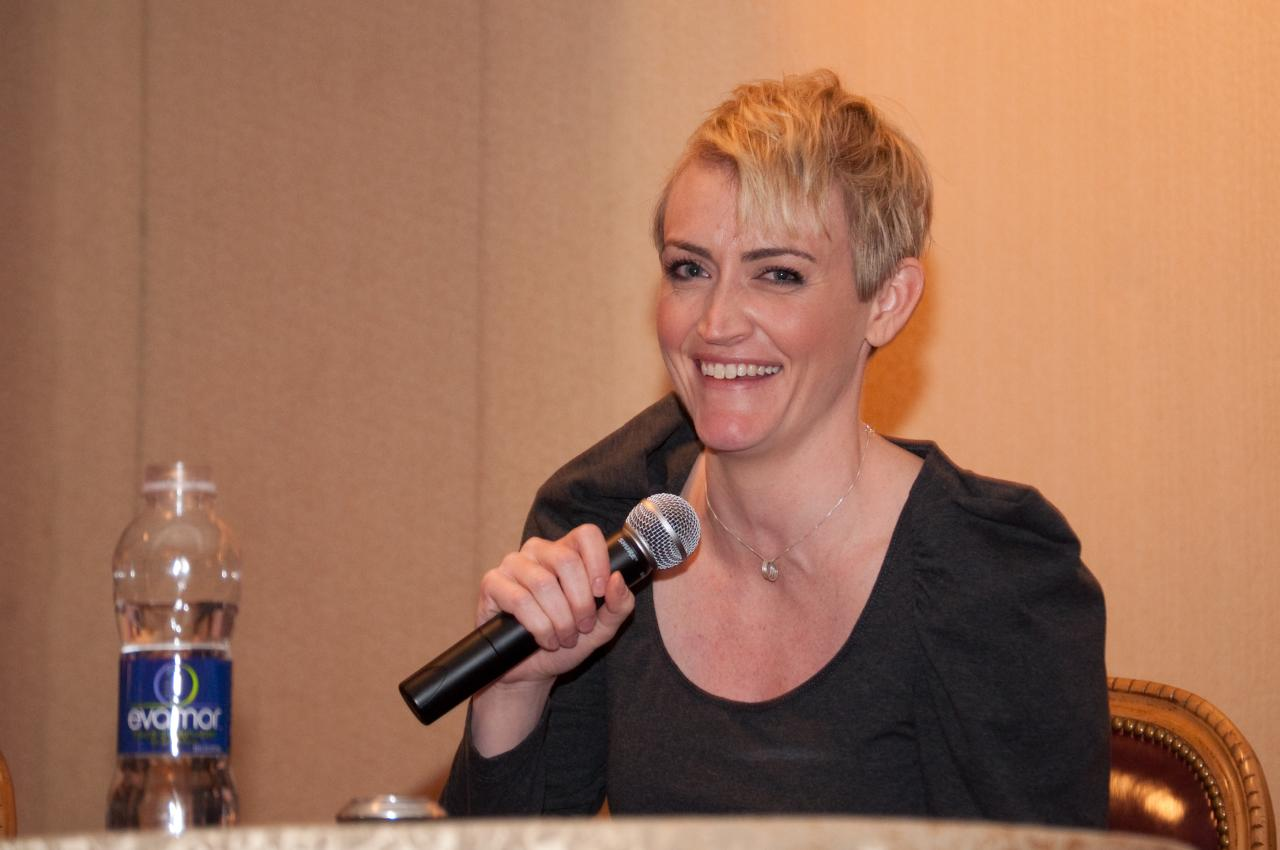
Armstrong in 2010

Dooce also attracted attention from websites devoted to making sardonic and critical observations about lifestyle bloggers, such as Get Off My Internets and the subreddit blogsnark. The mostly female readers of those forums second-guessed Armstrong's parenting decisions and suggested she did not appreciate how privileged she was. Heather responded by posting hate mail she received from the readers of those sites on a separate page, which she later took down, called "Monetizing the Hate"; Jon joked in 2011 that the traffic from the hate sites had been better for the family business than the birth of their second child two years earlier. By then the revenue from Dooce paid salaries not only to the Armstrongs but an assistant and two full-time babysitters.

In the mid-2010s, the readership of Dooce began to decline due to the increasing influence of social media. In the wake of her divorce, and criticism of her and her blog online, Armstrong retreated from regularly blogging and confronted her depression. After an experimental treatment in 2017 proved successful, she resumed her previous Internet posting, albeit to a much smaller audience, and began making money as an influencer, although she was critical of the practice.

== "Dooced" ==
In 2002, Armstrong ignited a fierce debate about privacy issues when she was allegedly fired from her job as a web designer and graphic artist because she had written satirical accounts of her experiences at a dot-com startup on her personal blog, dooce.com.

"Dooced" can mean "getting fired for something you've written on your website", a sense humorously disavowed by Armstrong in her blog's FAQ. This definition was used by the television game show Jeopardy! on December 10, 2009, as evidenced by a screenshot on her blog the following day.

== Books ==
In late 2005, Armstrong entered into negotiations with Kensington Books to publish two books, one of which was to be a memoir of early parenthood. The negotiations broke down in May 2006, and Kensington sued to force Armstrong to fulfill the terms of the unsigned contract. In October 2006 both parties agreed to a settlement that allowed Armstrong to seek another publisher.

Kensington Books published a book of essays, Things I Learned About My Dad: In Therapy, on April 29, 2008, edited by Heather B. Armstrong.

Her second book, It Sucked and Then I Cried: How I Had a Baby, a Breakdown, and a Much Needed Margarita, was published on March 24, 2009, by Simon Spotlight Entertainment. It reached #16 on The New York Times Bestseller List for April 12, 2009.

The Valedictorian of Being Dead was published in 2019.

== Other ventures ==
Armstrong was a music columnist and consultant for Alpha Mom. She and her ex-husband ran Armstrong Media, LLC, a web design, advertising and content-generation business. As of 2015, Jon Armstrong was running it without her. She also was a panelist for the online video series Momversation.

In late 2009, Armstrong announced a partnership with the television network HGTV in which she would "work with HGTV's online and on-air production teams to create innovative convergence programming for the network." While the bulk of her partnership activities began in early 2010, Armstrong began contributing weekly content to the network's Design Happens blog in February 2010. Her last post on Design Happens was in September 2010.

== Personal life ==
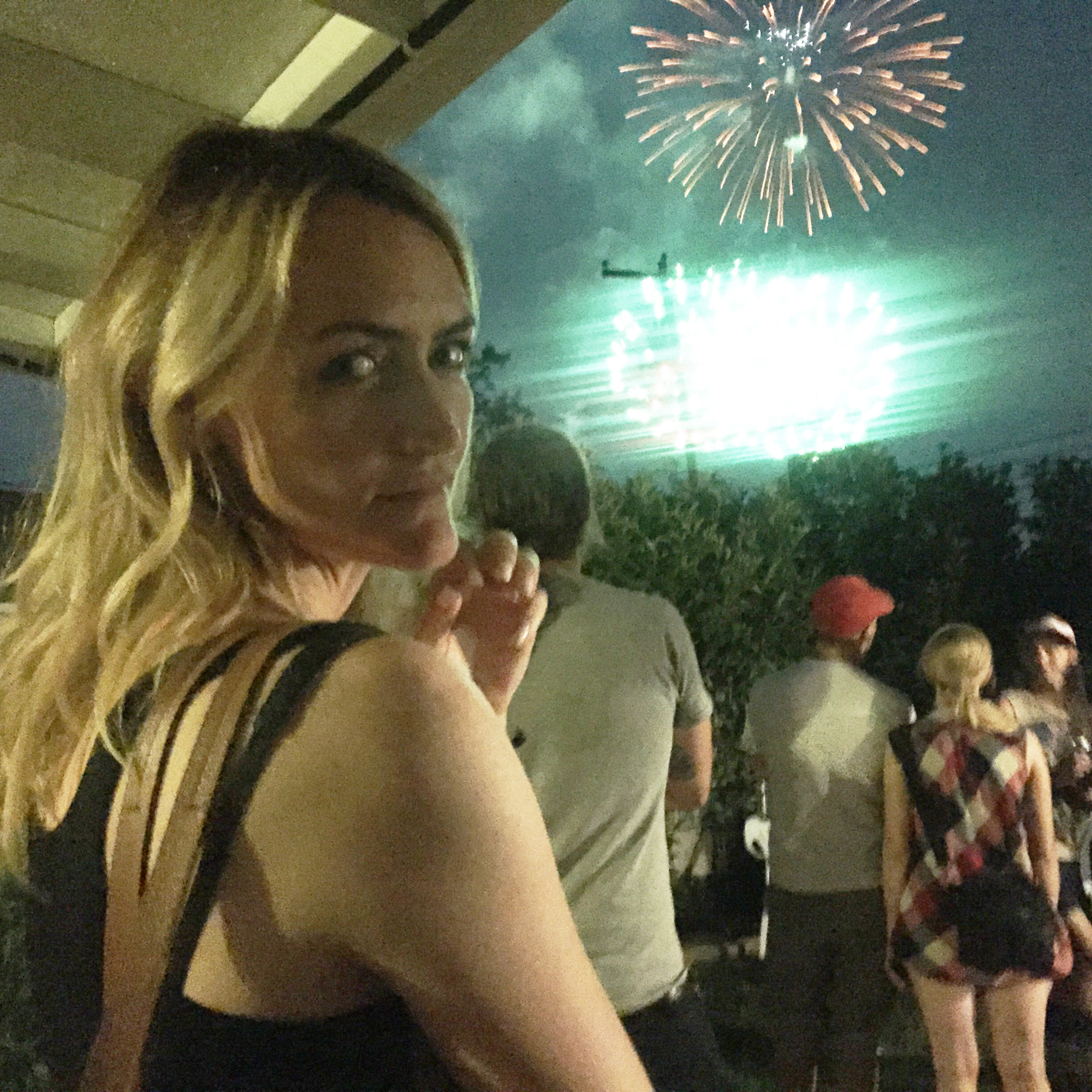
Armstrong in 2015

=== Marriage, divorce, hiatus, and depression ===
Through a mutual friend Heather met Jon Armstrong, another former Mormon web developer from Utah. They married and returned to their home state to start a family. In 2004, after the couple's first daughter was born, Armstrong began devoting much of her blog to parenting, becoming one of the first, as well as most popular, mommybloggers. Their second daughter was born in 2009.

In 2012, the Armstrongs announced they were separating; they divorced later that year. Heather posted to Dooce explaining why, while Jon posted on his blog, Blurbomat. At the time the announcement came as a surprise since Heather had never written about any marital difficulties, and had often written positively of her husband's support for her during her struggles with the children and her depression. Later, she said the couple had at that point been in counseling for years; Jon was "controlling and punishing" and expected her to just get over the negative commentary on her site.

The divorce was finalized in 2013. Jon moved to New York City with a new girlfriend, Liz Gumbinner; the Armstrong children spent the summer with him. In 2015, Armstrong announced that she would be taking a step back from blogging to focus on speaking and consulting work. While she was able at first to travel and make speaking engagements, and do some freelance marketing work, she soon found the pressures of single parenthood overwhelmed her. Depression returned and in 2017, Armstrong said she felt like "a heap of nothingness" and could not go on living.

That year, she enrolled in a clinical trial at the University of Utah's Neuropsychiatric Institute. Over 10 sessions, she was put into an induced coma for 15 minutes, an action meant to simulate brain death. After the treatment, she felt well enough to resume blogging as regularly as she had before 2015, and also published The Valedictorian of Being Dead, a book about her experience.

=== Later life and death ===
Armstrong returned to a different Internet. Most lifestyle bloggers like her had been replaced by, or evolved into, influencers. "Mommy blogging is dead, and I think most of my colleagues would agree", she told Vox in 2019.

Armstrong continued to write sponsored content, getting affiliate marketing revenue from Stitch Fix and Amazon, and maintained an Instagram feed in addition to her blog. Dooce still got a half million readers per month, most of them from her following a decade earlier. She did not post any pictures or anecdotes about her children without their approval. In addition to her standard material about her parenting and family issues, Armstrong also posted about mental health issues such as those she herself faced. "I want people with depression to feel like they are seen", she said, "especially here in Utah, where teen suicide is an epidemic." Eventually, she told Vox, she wanted to start a nonprofit devoted to the subject.

After the divorce, she and Pete Ashdown, a tech entrepreneur and two-time Democratic candidate for the U.S. Senate seats from Utah, became romantically involved. He lived with her and her children. He, too, is a former Mormon.

On May 9, 2023, Ashdown found Armstrong dead by an apparent suicide by gunshot in their shared Salt Lake City home. Armstrong had had chronic depression. Ashdown stated that Armstrong had been sober from alcohol for 18 months before recently relapsing.

== See also ==
- List of Brigham Young University alumni
- List of family-and-homemaking blogs
- List of former or dissident LDS
- List of people from Memphis, Tennessee
- List of people from Salt Lake City
