= Utah Telecommunication Open Infrastructure Agency =

Consortium of Utah cities

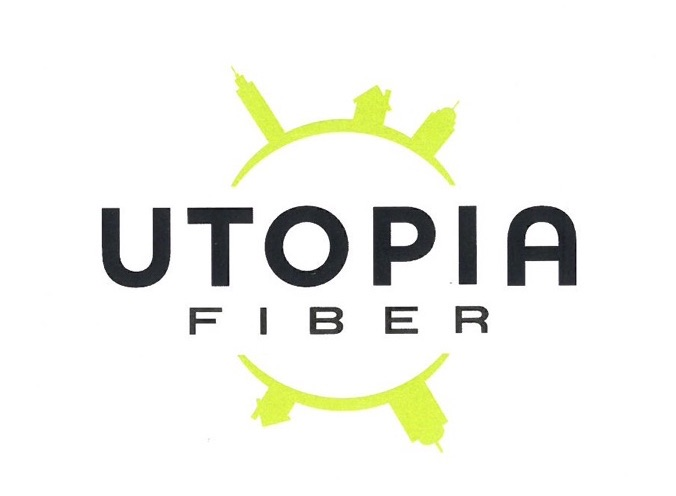
Logo for UTOPIA Fiber.

The Utah Telecommunication Open Infrastructure Agency (UTOPIA) is a consortium of 20 Utah cities with 3 additional operational partners engaged in deploying and operating a fiber to the premises network to every business and household within its footprint. Using an active Ethernet infrastructure and operating at the wholesale level, UTOPIA is considered an open-access network and promotes competition in all telecommunications services.

== History ==
2002 First feasibility study 2004 authorization of first bonds 2007 falls short of subscriber goal of 35%, reaching only 16% subscribership to service. 2014 proposal for a private equity firm purchase, which fails to go through 2015 approached net zero operational cost, which would end years of operational losses subsidized by member cities.

== Operations ==
UTOPIA operates as a wholesale fiber-optic network and is prohibited by law from providing retail services. There are currently 15 service providers on the UTOPIA network and the network is open to additional service providers that meet certain qualifications. Though UTOPIA has extended an open invitation to Comcast, CenturyLink (formerly Qwest), and Frontier Communications, the incumbent service providers, all have declined to join the network.

== Financing ==
UTOPIA bonds for construction costs using sales tax pledges as collateral to secure the bond. Revenues to cover the bonds are then set aside by pledging cities in an interest-bearing account and will only be used should subscriber revenues fail to cover the debt service. Because UTOPIA cities all bond at the same time and use their collective bond ratings and taxing authority, financing is generally seen as low-risk and secures a low interest rate.

UTOPIA encountered financial problems in late 2007 and halted all new construction. They have applied for and been approved for loans from the US Department of Agriculture's Rural Utilities Service (RUS) program. These loans required UTOPIA to submit a construction plan for approval and, once approved, apply for reimbursement. UTOPIA reportedly ran into multiple delays in seeking reimbursement before being outright refused any further reimbursement from RUS without explanation. At the time, UTOPIA had $11M in outstanding construction costs that had not been reimbursed by RUS. UTOPIA has since sued RUS for damages.

Because of these problems, UTOPIA asked its pledging member cities to extend the bonding period from 20 to 30 years and bond for additional to connect additional customers, complete unfinished sections of the network, and provide two years of capitalized interest payments. The new bond is for $185M with a total cost including interest of $500M. The network has over 11,000 subscribers.

A new proposal in 2014 has surfaced from an Australian investment company called Macquarie Group. By June 27, 2014 eleven of the cities will need to decide to move forward with a proposed plan to incorporate the expense of construction costs as a mandatory utility fee or not. The proposed fees would range from about $18–25 more per month for everyone in those cities. Regardless, the cities still retain this debt, and if the plan was voted down, then each of those cities would have to raise city taxes/fees in order to pay off the loans.

=== Utah Infrastructure Agency ===
The Utah Infrastructure Agency (UIA) is an interlocal agency formed in June 2010 with 9 of the 11 original UTOPIA pledging member cities. UIA is a funding mechanism to finance new build areas for new customers. Beginning with the deployment in Brigham City in 2009, UTOPIA began a ftth ownership-like model of installation to the subscriber. This is either done as a lump-sum payment of $2,750 or financed over 10 or 20 years. The UIA provides a way to finance payments using bonds backed by subscribers and issued by the participating cities. The payment is around $25/mo on the 20-year plan or $30/mo and $300 down for a 10-year option. They have also introduced a lease option which requires a 1-year commitment for $30 a month (goes to Month-to-Month billing after the period is up). UIA previously offered a 2-year lease instead. Even though leasing does not lead to owning the fiber portal as a house utility in the future, it has been wildly successful due to the low commitment. These financing options only cover the cost of the network connection and service is billed separately (around $35/mo for 250 Mbit/s or $50–65 for 1 Gbit/s symmetrical service as of May 2017).

== UTOPIA Fiber cities ==
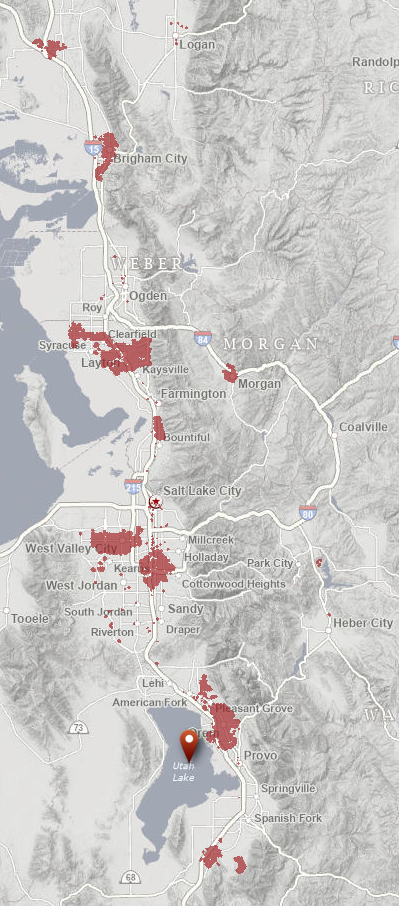
UTOPIA coverage area as of May 24, 2024

Utopia is available in at least parts of the following cities:

- Bountiful
- Brigham City
- Bozeman
- Centerville
- Clearfield
- Idaho Falls
- Layton
- Lindon
- Midvale
- Morgan
- Murray
- Orem
- Payson
- Perry
- Pleasant Grove
- Santa Clara
- Syracuse
- Tremonton
- West Haven
- West Point
- West Valley City
- Woodland Hills

== Types of service ==
The types of service provided depend on the service provider. UTOPIA itself doesn't set any requirements on the services offered.

- VOIP (Phone)
- IPTV (Video)
- Data (Internet)

== Service providers ==
ISP	Price / Month	Phone Plans	Data Cap	Static IP	IPv6	Support	ASN
1Wire Fiber	Business Only provider from 75 Mbps up to 10 Gbps	Full Unified Communications service (UCaaS) Full feature set for the SMB space all included	No	Yes	Yes	801-214-9000	[0]
Advanced Stream	250 Mbps $37.00; 1 Gbps $55.00; 10 Gbps $199.99	Advanced Stream Phone: includes free long distance to the United States and Canada, Call Forwarding, Caller ID, Call Waiting, Voicemail, Voicemail to email, and more. $24.95	10TB cap	No	?	801-877-8000	?
Beehive	250 Mbps $34.95; 1 Gbps $49.95	Beehive Phone - Self Installation $19.95 Beehive Phone - Technician Installation $19.95	No	free	?	24/7; 435-837-6000	
Brigham.net	250 Mbps $34.95; 1 Gbps $54.95; 10 Gbps $199.99	Brigham.net Phone: Voice line includes 500 minutes Free Long Distance, Caller ID, Call Waiting, Call Forwarding, Voicemail, Follow me & E-911 services. $19.95	No	$6 / month	?	Monday - Friday 10AM - 6PM; Saturday 10AM – 2PM; 435-723-5800	?
CentraCom	250 Mbps $34.95; 1 Gbps $49.95	CentraCom Phone $15.00	No	$10 / ip / month	Yes	24/7; 1-800-427-8449	
ConnectFast	1 Gbps $39.95	No	$15 for /30 / month $20 for /29 / month	?	Monday - Friday; 8AM - 5PM; 385-429-5981	Leverages Syringa	
Fibernet	250 Mbps $34.95; 1 Gbps $49.95	2TB cap $0.20 per GB Over	free	?	1-800-305-6995	?	
InfoWest	250 Mbps $35.00; 1 Gbps $48.00	InfoWest Phone $15.00	10TB cap	$5 / month	?	866-463-6937	
Intellipop	250 Mbps $34.95; 1 Gbps $46.95	No	$5 / month Limit 1	?	24/7; 801-851-1770		
Miles Broadband	250 Mbps $35.00; 1 Gbps $55.00; 10 Gbps $200.00	No	$5 / ip / month	?	801-368-8814	?	
Rise Broadband	250 Mbps $40.00; 1 Gbps $54.00	Monthly Phone $20.00	No	?	Monday – Friday 5AM – 10PM; Saturday – Sunday 7AM – 8PM; 844-411-RISE		
Senawave	250 Mbps $37.00; 1 Gbps $50.00	Standard Calling $17.99 Premium US48 $27.98	?	?	?	801-217-9000	
Sumo Fiber	250 Mbps $30.00 - $35.00; 1 Gbps $40.00 - $48.00; 10 Gbps $170.00 - $200.00	Unlimited Plan (USA48) $15.00	No	1 IP for $5; 5 IPs for $15	Yes	Monday - Friday 8AM - 9PM; Saturday 9AM - 5PM; 801-320-1000	
Veracity	250 Mbps $34.99; 1 Gbps $54.99; 10 Gbps $199.99	Veracity Phone $9.99	No	Up to 2 IPs $2 / month each	?	1-800-240-4008	
Voonami	250 Mbps $34.95; 1 Gbps $48.95	Voonami Phone ( Unlimited 48 States) $9.95	No	1st is Free	No	24/7; 801-995-4000	
XMission	250 Mbps $37.00; 1 Gbps $50.00; 10 Gbps $250.00	XMission Phone $15.00	No	Available for $5; Additional IP's are Sold in block of 8 or 16	Yes	24/7; 801-539-0852	

== Network management/design ==
UTOPIA's network design is handled by UTOPIA's Network Engineers.
