= Reverse blog =

Blog type

A reverse blog (also known as a group blog) is a type of blog written entirely by the users, who are given a topic. The blog posts are usually screened and chosen for publication by a core group or the publisher of the blog.

A reverse blog is different from a traditional blog, which is created by a single, specific author (i.e. blogger). The blogger will write about a given topic and other users may view and sometimes comment on the blogger's work.

A reverse blog is characterized primarily by the lack of a blogger on a site providing blog-style content. The number of comments must be limited in order to differentiate a reverse blog from a forum. This number of comments must be fixed as well. These are the primary and necessary characteristics of a reverse blog. The reverse blog is also commonly called an inverse blog.
