= Criticism of the Church of Jesus Christ of Latter-day Saints =

The Church of Jesus Christ of Latter-day Saints (LDS Church) has been subject to scholarly and religious criticism and public debate since its inception in the early 19th century. The discussion encompasses a wide range of issues from the church's leaders, origins, and teachings, to its social and political stances. The historical claims of the church—including the authenticity of foundational books of scripture such as the Book of Mormon and Pearl of Great Price, as well as the church's former practice of polygamy—have faced public scrutiny. Changes in church teachings, as well as former teachings perceived as harsh or extreme face criticism as well. In the modern day, its historical teachings and policies around skin color and those around Black and Native American people, along with its past and current views on LGBTQ people and women have received greater public attention. Other controversies include church leaders' handling of sexual abuse cases, church finances, members critical of church leadership, and allegations of hiding or distorting parts of church history.

In the late 1820s, criticism centered around founder Joseph Smith stating he had been led to a set of golden plates from which he said the Book of Mormon was translated. In the 1830s, one of several criticisms was for Smith's handling of a banking failure in Kirtland, Ohio. The bulk of members moved to Missouri where there was fear and suspicion about the LDS Church's political and military power, culminating in the 1838 Mormon War and the Mormon Extermination Order by Missouri governor Lilburn Boggs. In the 1840s, criticism of the church centered on its theocratic aspirations in Nauvoo, Illinois. Criticism of the practice of religious polygamy called plural marriage and other doctrines taught by Smith were published in the Nauvoo Expositor. Smith ordered the destruction of the Expositor printing press. Opposition led to a series of legal challenges culminating in the arrest then death of Smith and his brother while jailed in 1844.

After Smith was killed, and a subsequent succession crisis, the majority of Mormons followed Brigham Young and migrated west beginning in 1847. As the church began openly practicing plural marriage under Young during the second half of the 19th century, the church became the target of nationwide criticism for that practice, as well as for the church's theocratic aspirations in Utah Territory. Young introduced policies in 1852 that discriminated against black men and women of African descent which were not reversed until 1978. Beginning in 1857, the church also came under significant media criticism after a militia of church members murdered around two hundred children, women, and men in the Mountain Meadows Massacre in southern Utah.

Academic critics have questioned the legitimacy of Smith and successors prophets as well as the historical authenticity of the Book of Mormon and the Book of Abraham. Criticism has expanded to include assertions of historical revisionism, homophobia, racism, and sexist policies. Notable 20th-century critics include Jerald and Sandra Tanner and historian Fawn Brodie, and John Dehlin in the 21st century. Evangelical Christians continue to argue that Smith was either fraudulent or delusional. A 2023 survey of over 1,000 former church members (often called Ex-Mormons) in the Mormon corridor found the top three reported criticisms of the church that led to disaffiliation were: 1. Church history related to Joseph Smith; 2. The Book of Mormon; and 3. Race issues.

== Critics ==
Notable early critics of Mormonism included Lucy Harris, Abner Cole, Eber D. Howe, and Thomas C. Sharp. Notable modern critics of the LDS Church include Jerald and Sandra Tanner, Richard Abanes, Richard and Joan Ostling, historian Fawn M. Brodie, Jeremy Runnells, and John Dehlin. Expansion of Internet use also provided a new forum for critics. Notable collections of criticism include the CES Letter, Year of Polygamy podcast, and Mormon Stories Podcast.

The church's 2008 support of California's Proposition 8 sparked heated debate and protests by gay-rights organizations. Affirmation is a group of current and former members of the LDS Church who have criticized the church's policies on homosexuality. Christian Apologetics and Research Ministry is a Christian organization that has criticized the church's theology. The Institute for Religious Research is an organization that has criticized the church, in particular the Book of Abraham. Numerous other organizations maintain web sites that criticize the church.

== Public perception ==
The LDS Church scored lower in favorability on two large 2022 US polls in comparison to other religions. It had the lowest percentage (15%) of any of the seven religious groups for those with a "favorable/somewhat favorable" view of the religion in the Pew Research Center survey, and nearly 3/4ths (71%) of American respondents held a "very or somewhat unfavorable" opinion of the LDS Church in the YouGov poll. In response to the negative findings in the Pew poll, LDS podcaster Susan M. Hinckley summarized some common criticisms stating, "the organization seems slow to change, reluctant to admit mistakes, unwilling to apologize, overly legalistic, and quick to spin every story to its advantage."

== Historical criticisms ==
=== Polygamy ===
Polygamy is perhaps the most controversial early Mormon practice, and was a key contributing factor for Smith's murder. Under heavy pressure—Utah would not be accepted as a state if polygamy was practiced—the church formally and publicly renounced the practice in 1890. Utah's statehood soon followed. However, plural marriage remains a divisive issue, as despite the official renunciation of 1890, it still has sympathizers, defenders, and semi-secret practitioners.

Sarah Pratt, first wife of apostle Orson Pratt, in an outspoken critique of Mormon polygamy, said that polygamy:

"completely demoralizes good men and makes bad men correspondingly worse. As for the women—well, God help them! First wives it renders desperate, or else heart-broken, mean-spirited creatures."

Pratt ended her marriage to husband Orson Pratt in 1868 because of his "obsession with marrying younger women" (at age 57, Orson Pratt married a sixteen-year-old girl, his tenth wife, younger than his daughter Celestia). Sarah Pratt lashed out at Orson in an 1877 interview, stating:

"Here was my husband, gray headed, taking to his bed young girls in mockery of marriage. Of course there could be no joy for him in such an intercourse except for the indulgence of his fanaticism and of something else, perhaps, which I hesitate to mention."

The Tanners argue that early church leaders established the practice of polygamy in order to justify behavior that would otherwise be regarded as immoral. The Ostlings criticize Joseph Smith for marrying at least 32 women during his lifetime, including several under the age of 16, a fact acknowledged by Mormon historian Todd Compton. Compton also acknowledges that Smith entered into polyandrous marriages (that is, he married women who were already married to other men) and that he warned some potential spouses of eternal damnation if they did not consent to be his wife; in at least two cases, Smith married orphan girls who had come to live at his home.

However, Bushman notes that evidence of sexual relations between Smith and any wives of his followers is sparse or unreliable. Compton argues that some marriages were likely dynastic in nature, to link families.

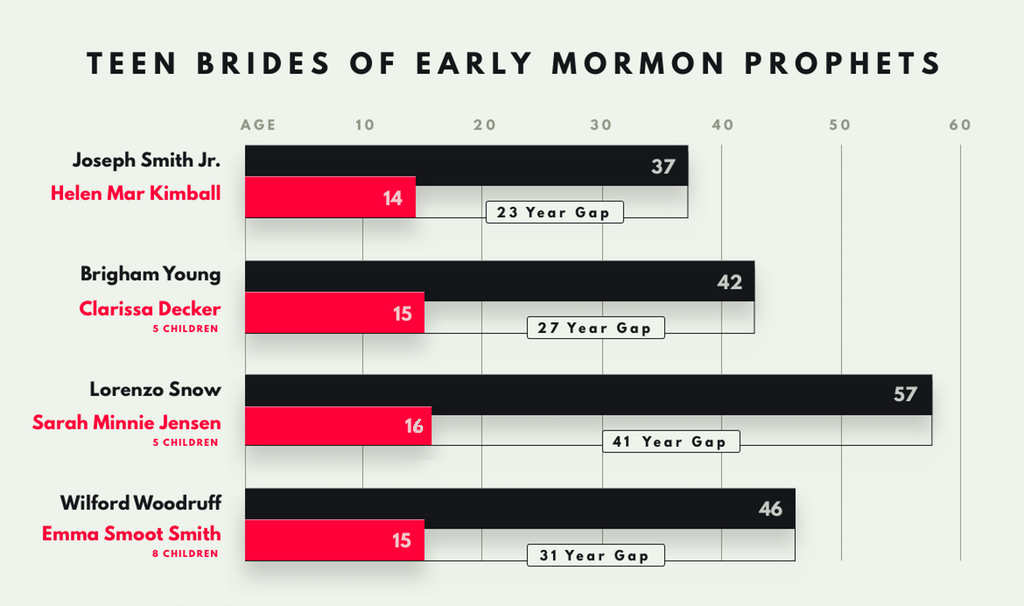
Bar chart showing age differences at the time of polygamous marriage between teenage brides and early Latter Day Saint church leaders. The average age of first marriage for white US women from 1850 to 1880 was 23, with those marrying at ages from 15 to 19 ranging from 6.5 to 27.5 percent of the population depending on region and year.

==== 1890 Discontinuance ====
The Tanners argue that the church's 1890 reversal of its policy on polygamy was done for political reasons, citing the fact that the change was made during the church's lengthy conflict with the federal government over property seizures and statehood. The Ostlings say that, soon after the church received the revelation that polygamy was prohibited, Utah again applied for statehood. This time the federal government did not object to starting the statehood process. Six years later, the process was completed and Utah was admitted as a state in 1896. The Ostlings note that soon after the church suspended the practice of polygamy, the federal government reduced its legal efforts to seize church property. Despite this, Mormon leaders after 1890 continued to sanction and participate in plural marriages in secret, in smaller numbers, both in the U.S. and in Mexico, for the next several decades. This was done to place obedience to God above conformity with society or "mammon." Breakaway polygamist groups took this a step further, parting with Salt Lake's leaders and practicing polygamy openly.

Mormons Ron Wood and Linda Thatcher do not dispute that the change was a result of federal intervention and say that the church had no choice in the matter. The 1887 Edmunds–Tucker Act was crippling the church and "something dramatic had to be done to reverse [the] trend." After the church appealed its case to the U.S. Supreme Court and lost, church president Wilford Woodruff issued the 1890 Manifesto. Woodruff noted in his journal that he was "acting for the temporal salvation of the Church".

==== After 1890 ====
Richard Abanes, Richard and Joan Ostling, and D. Michael Quinn note that after the 1890 Manifesto, church leaders authorized more than 200 polygamous marriages and lied about the continuing practice.

Joseph F. Smith acknowledged reports that church leaders did not fully adhere to the 1890 prohibition. After the Second Manifesto in 1904, anyone entering into a new plural marriage was excommunicated.

=== Historical authenticity of LDS scripture ===
==== The Book of Mormon ====
Discussion regarding the historicity of the Book of Mormon often focuses on archaeological issues, some of which relate to the large size and the long time span of the civilizations mentioned in the book. After Joseph Smith founded the movement in upstate New York in the 1820s, the faith drew its first converts while Smith was dictating the text of the Book of Mormon from golden plates with reformed Egyptian writing on them, which he said he found buried after being directed to their location by the Angel Moroni. The book described itself as a chronicle of early indigenous peoples of the Americas, known as the Nephites, portraying them as believing Israelites who had a belief in Christ many hundreds of years before Jesus's birth. According to the book, the Nephites are one of four groups (the others being the Lamanites, Jaredites, and Mulekites) who settled in the ancient Americas. The Nephites are described as a group of people that descended from or were associated with Nephi, the son of the prophet Lehi, who left Jerusalem at the urging of God c. 600 BC and traveled with his family to the Western Hemisphere, arriving in the Americas c. 589 BC. After the translation was complete, Smith said he returned the golden plates to the Angel Moroni.

A contemporary Mormon view is that these Israelite civilizations rose and fell in Mesoamerica. Civilizations of their magnitude and duration would be expected to leave extensive archaeological records. Several Mesoamerican civilizations did exist in the time period covered by the Book of Mormon, including the Olmec, Zapotec and Maya.

The Book of Mormon mentions several animals, plants, and technologies for which there is no evidence in Book of Mormon time frames in pre-Columbian America. These include asses, cattle, horses, oxen, sheep, swine, goats, elephants, wheat, barley, silk, steel, brass, breast plates, chains, plows, swords, scimitars, and chariots. The Smithsonian Institution stated in 1997 that "none of the principal food plants and domestic animals of the Old World (except the dog) were present in the New World before Columbus."

Adherents of the Latter Day Saint movement give varied responses to these criticisms. Some invoke the limited geography model, regarding the events of the Book of Mormon as taking place in such a geographically limited area that no evidence should be expected. Some counter that the words used in the Book of Mormon refer not to the animals, plants and technologies that they do presently but to other similar items that did exist at the time. A 2023 survey of over 1,000 former church members in the Mormon corridor found the Book of Mormon to be the second most commonly cited criticisms that led to disaffiliation.

==== The Book of Abraham ====
The Book of Abraham is a work produced between 1835 and 1842 by Smith that he said was "a translation of some ancient records ... purporting to be the writings of Abraham, while he was in Egypt, called the Book of Abraham, written by his own hand, upon papyrus". The work was first published in 1842 and today is a canonical part of the Pearl of Great Price. The Book of Abraham is not accepted as a historical document by non-LDS scholars and by some LDS scholars. Even the existence of the patriarch Abraham in the Biblical narrative is questioned by some researchers. Various anachronism and 19th century themes lead scholars to conclude that the Book of Abraham is a 19th century creation. Since its printing, the Book of Abraham has been a source of controversy. Numerous non-LDS Egyptologists, beginning in the mid-19th century, have heavily criticized Joseph Smith's translation and explanations of the facsimiles, unanimously concluding that his interpretations are inaccurate. They have also asserted that missing portions of the facsimiles were reconstructed incorrectly by Smith.

The controversy intensified in the late 1960s when portions of the Joseph Smith Papyri were located. Translations of the papyri revealed the rediscovered portions bore no relation to the Book of Abraham text. University of Chicago Egyptologist Robert K. Ritner concluded in 2014 that the source of the Book of Abraham "is the 'Breathing Permit of Hôr,' misunderstood and mistranslated by Joseph Smith." He later said the Book of Abraham is now "confirmed as a perhaps well-meaning, but erroneous invention by Joseph Smith," and "despite its inauthenticity as a genuine historical narrative, the Book of Abraham remains a valuable witness to early American religious history and to the recourse to ancient texts as sources of modern religious faith and speculation."

=== Criticisms of Joseph Smith ===
In the 1830s, the church was heavily criticized for Smith's handling of a banking failure in Kirtland, Ohio. After the Mormons migrated west, there was fear and suspicion about the LDS Church's political and military power in Missouri, (Note: Bushman noted that in Daviess County, Missouri, non-Mormons "watched local government fall into the hands of people they saw as deluded fanatics".) culminating in the 1838 Mormon War and the Mormon Extermination Order (Missouri Executive Order 44) by Governor Lilburn Boggs. In the 1840s, criticism of the church included its theocratic aspirations in Nauvoo, Illinois. Criticism of the practice of plural marriage and other doctrines taught by Smith were published in the Nauvoo Expositor. (Note: Historian Fawn Brodie argued that given its authors' intentions to reform the church, the paper was "extraordinarily restrained" given the explosive allegations it could have raised. A prospectus for the newspaper was published on May 10, and referred to Smith as a "self-constituted monarch".) Opposition led to a series of events culminating in the killing of Smith and his brother while jailed in 1844. A 2023 survey of over 1,000 former church members in the Mormon corridor found church history around Joseph Smith to be the number one most commonly cited criticisms that led to disaffiliation.

=== Adam–God doctrine ===
The Ostlings criticize Brigham Young's teachings that God and Adam are the same being. One apostle, Franklin D. Richards, also accepted the doctrine as taught by Young, stating in a conference held in June 1854 that "the Prophet and Apostle Brigham has declared it, and that it is the word of the Lord". But, when the concept was first introduced, several LDS leaders disagreed with the doctrine, including apostle Orson Pratt, who expressed that disagreement publicly. The church never formally adopted the doctrine, and has since officially repudiated it.

== Violent actions and teachings ==
LDS leaders have ordered numerous instances of violence, and used violent rhetoric in their teachings and temple ceremonies. Some historic examples of Mormon-perpetrated mass murders include the following massacres: Mountain Meadows, Battle Creek, Provo River, Skull Valley, Nephi, Grass Valley, Circleville, Fountain Green, Salt Creek, and the Aiken massacre.

=== Mountain Meadows Massacre ===
The Mountain Meadows Massacre (September 7–11, 1857) was a series of attacks by Mormon militiamen in Utah territory that resulted in the mass murder of at least 120 members of the Baker–Fancher wagon train including children 7 and older and women. In modern times, the murders have been called an act of domestic terrorism in many works of literature. and is considered the largest act of domestic terrorism in United States history prior to the 1995 Oklahoma City bombing. Other descriptors include "the darkest deed of the nineteenth century" and "a crime that has no parallel in American history for atrocity". Historian of the American West Will Bagley stated it was "the most brutal act of religious terrorism in America history" before the 2001 September 11 attacks.

=== Blood atonement ===
Brigham Young introduced a doctrine known as "blood atonement", regarding the unpardonable sin, or sin for which Jesus Christ's atonement does not apply. He taught the belief that a person could only atone for such sins by giving up his or her life. Various church leaders in the 19th century taught likewise, but more recently church leaders have taught that the atonement of Jesus Christ is all-encompassing and that there is no sin so severe that it cannot be forgiven (with the exception of the "unpardonable sin" of denying the Holy Ghost).

=== Temple penalties ===
In Mormonism, a penalty is a specified punishment for breaking an oath of secrecy after receiving the Nauvoo endowment ceremony. Adherents promised they would submit to execution in specific ways should they reveal certain contents of the ceremony. In the ceremony participants each symbolically enacted three of the methods of their execution: throat slitting, heart removal, and disembowelment. These penalties were first instituted by Joseph Smith in 1842, and further developed by Brigham Young after Smith's death. The penalties were removed from the ceremony in 1990. Author and former Brigham Young University professor Brian Evenson wrote a depiction of the penalties in a novel, and stated "any book that spoke in any detail about the relationship of Mormon culture to violence needed to acknowledge the connection of the temple ceremony to violence." Writer J. Aaron Sanders stated that the temple penalties were a form of blood atonement, and author Peter Levenda linked Smith's introduction of the Masonic blood oaths into the temple endowment as a step towards later threats of blood atonement for other perceived crimes in Utah territory.

== Exaltation doctrine ==
Critics such as Richard Abanes and the Institute for Religious Research criticize the church for changing the principle asserting that God was once a man. They cite changes to the LDS Church publication Gospel Principles between the 1978 and 1997 editions, where "We can become Gods like our Heavenly Father" was changed to "We can become like our Heavenly Father", and "our Heavenly Father became a God" was changed to "our Heavenly Father became God". But, official LDS Church publications still affirm the doctrine of eternal progression, and the official church manual, Teachings of Presidents of the Church: Lorenzo Snow (2012), affirms that "As man is, God once was; as God now is, man may be." The 2011 edition of Gospel Principles quotes Joseph Smith as stating, "It is the first principle of the Gospel to know for a certainty the Character of God. … He was once a man like us; … God himself, the Father of us all, dwelt on an earth, the same as Jesus Christ himself did".

== Responses to abuse allegations ==
Reacting to accusations of abuse by teachers, Boy Scouts leaders, clergy, etc., social welfare activists have campaigned for more robust measures toward greater prevention of abuse of individuals served by counselors and other professionals, advocating greater transparency and quicker referral of allegations to criminal investigators.

The Survivors Network of those Abused by Priests and others have criticized one-on-one ("worthiness") interviews between LDS pastoral leaders and (especially) adolescent congregants, believing them "an invitation" for abuse. An editorial in the sectarian (LDS Church) Deseret News responded:

The LDS Church has a zero tolerance policy concerning sexual misconduct. It also gives specific instruction on conducting one-on-one interviews with youths, including encouraging them to have parents or other trustworthy adults sit directly outside the room. Church leaders are to avoid any situation that could be misinterpreted.

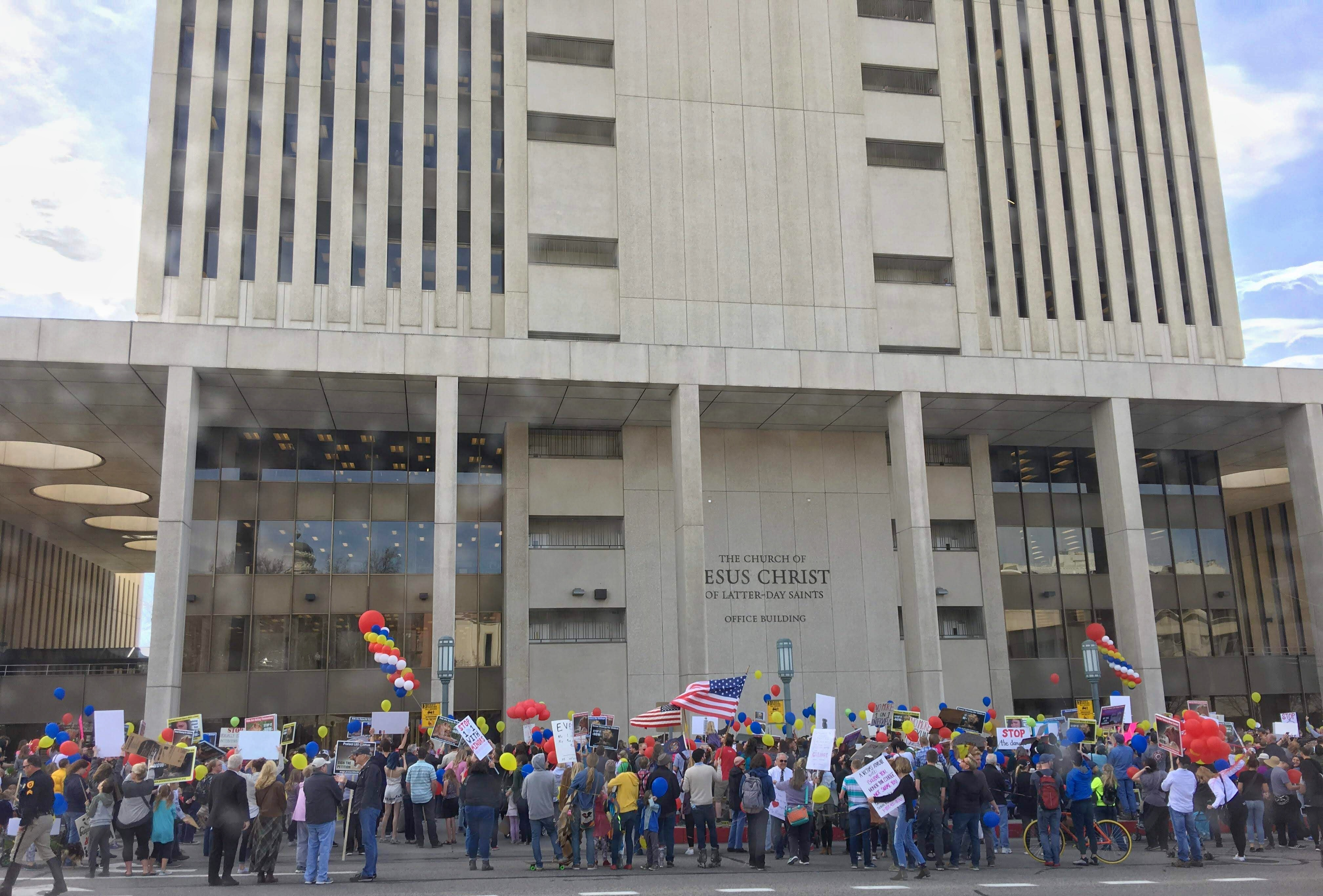
2018 protest over leaders' sexual interviews with children and teens.

In 2018 over 800 protesters gathered and marched to the LDS Church headquarters to deliver a petition with over 55,000 signatures asking for an end to semiannual, closed-door, one-on-one interviews between adult male local church leaders and children and teens during which many members have been asked about their sexual behaviors and thoughts in ways they felt were harmful.

== Finances ==
The church has often been secretive about its finances, especially in the United States. The church has not disclosed its assets in the U.S. since 1959. This has drawn criticism from the Ostlings and the Tanners, who consider its financial practices to be overly secretive.

The church does disclose financials in the United Kingdom and Canada, where it is required to by law. In addition, the church employs an independent audit department that provides its certification at each annual general conference that church contributions are collected and spent in accordance with church policy. Moreover, the church engages a public accounting firm (currently Deloitte & Touche in the United States; PricewaterhouseCoopers in the United Kingdom) to perform annual audits of its not-for-profit, for-profit, and educational entities. Lay leaders at the local level are not paid.

The Tanners and the Ostlings accuse the church of being overly greedy and materialistic, citing the large amount of wealth accumulated by the church, and citing the strong emphasis on tithing, and suggest that the church is more like a business than a spiritual endeavor.

In December 2019, a whistleblower alleged the church holds over $100 billion in investment funds, which are managed by an affiliate, Ensign Peak Advisors; that it failed to use the funds for charitable purposes and instead used them in for-profit ventures; and that it misled contributors and the public about the usage and extent of those funds. According to the whistleblower, applicable law requires the funds be used for religious, educational or other charitable purposes for the fund to maintain its tax-exempt status. (Note: If confirmed, the $100 billion net worth would exceed the combined net worths of the world's largest university endowment (Harvard University) and the world's largest philanthropic foundation (Gates Foundation).) Other commentators have argued that such expenditures may not be legally required as stated. (Note: This is due to the categorization of Ensign Peak Advisors as an "integrated auxiliary of a church", not a public foundation.)In response to the allegations, the church's First Presidency stated that "the Church complies with all applicable law governing our donations, investments, taxes, and reserves," and that "a portion" of funds received by the church are "methodically safeguarded through wise financial management and the building of a prudent reserve for the future."

== Responses to internal dissent ==
The Ostlings say that the LDS Church retaliates against members that publish information that undermines church policies, citing excommunications of scientist Simon Southerton and biographer Fawn M. Brodie. They further state that the church suppresses intellectual freedom, citing the 1993 excommunication of the "September Six", including gay LDS historian D. Michael Quinn, and author Lavina Fielding Anderson. The Ostlings write that Anderson was the first to reveal the LDS Church keeps files on Mormon scholars, documenting questionable activities, and the Ostlings state that "No other sizable religion in America monitors its followers in this way".

The American Association of University Professors, since 1998, has put LDS Church-owned Brigham Young University along with twenty-six other universities on its censured list of universities that do not allow tenured professors sufficient freedom in teaching and research.

Richard Abanes lists the following as church members excommunicated or censured for views unacceptable to the church hierarchy:

- Journalist Deborah Laake, for her book Secret Ceremonies: A Mormon Woman's Intimate Diary of Marriage and Beyond
- BYU English teacher Cecilia Konchar-Farr, for her views on abortion laws
- Writer Janice Merrill Allred
- English Professor Gail Houston
- Anthropologist David Knowlton

=== Church monitors members' critical publications ===
Richard Abanes and the Ostlings criticize the LDS Church for maintaining a group called the Strengthening Church Members Committee, led by two church apostles. According to the Ostlings, the purpose of this committee is to collect and file "letters to the editor, other writings, quotes in the media, and public activities" of church members that may be publishing views contrary to those of the church leadership. The committee has also recruited students to spy on professors at Brigham Young University who are suspected of violating the church's dictates.

The Tanners state that throughout the 20th century the church denied scholars access to many key church documents, and in 1979 said that it had refused to publish Joseph Smith's diary. Apologists point out that The Joseph Smith Papers project provides access to Smith's journals.

== Alleged distortion of church history ==
An analysis of B. H. Roberts's work History of the Church, when compared to the original manuscripts from which it is drawn, "more than 62,000 words" can be identified that were either added or deleted. Based on this analysis, Jerald and Sandra Tanner contend that the church distorts its history in order to portray itself in a more favorable light. Specifically, they allege that there was a systematic removal of events that portray Joseph Smith in a negative light.

The Tanners cite the selective use of Brigham Young's statements, presented in a manner to give the illusion that he was in favor of blacks receiving the priesthood. The Tanners also state that the church attempted to discredit evidence that Joseph Smith was arrested, tried, and found guilty by a justice of the peace in Bainbridge, New York, in 1826. The Tanners have also highlighted changes such as the title page of the 1830 edition of the Book of Mormon that described Smith as "Author and Proprietor" of the book, which was revised in subsequent editions to be "Translator", and the description of Oliver Cowdery's skill at using the divining rod found in the 1829 edition of the Book of Commandments, which does not appear in the corresponding section of the 1835 edition of the Doctrine and Covenants.

The Ostlings consider other omissions to be distortion, noting that the widely distributed church manual Teachings of Presidents of the Church: Brigham Young omits any mention of Young's polygamy, and that the book's chronological summary of Young's life includes the date of his first marriage, the date of the first wife's death, and the date of the second legal marriage, but omits mention of Young's dozens of other marriages.

In 1842, Willard Richards compiled a number of records in order to produce a history of the church. Among the records examined were the various accounts related to Zelph. In the process of combining the accounts, Richards crossed out Woodruff's references to "hill Cumorah," and Heber C. Kimball's reference to the "last great struggle with the Lamanites" (Note: "Zelph was a white Lamanite, a man of God who was a warrior and chieftain under the great prophet Onandagus who was known from the [hill Cumorah is crossed out in the manuscript] eastern Sea, to the Rocky Mountains. He was killed in battle, by the arrow found among his ribs, during a [last crossed out] great struggle with the Lamanites" [and Nephites crossed out].")

Mormon historian D. Michael Quinn has accused LDS Church leaders of urging historians to hide "controversies and difficulties of the Mormon past". Mormon scholar Allen Robers says church leaders "attempt to control depictions of the Mormon past". Non-Mormon professor John Hallwas of Western Illinois University says of LDS historians: "[they] do not mention Mormon intimidation, deception, repression, theft, and violence, or any other matters that might call into question the sacred nature of the Mormon experience."

Columbia University professor Richard Bushman, a member of The Joseph Smith Papers advisory board, responds to critics that those on the project "work on the assumption that the closer you get to Joseph Smith in the sources, the stronger he will appear, rather than the reverse, as is so often assumed by critics."

In 1969, the Western History Association published Jewish historian Moses Rischin's observation of a new trend among Mormon historians to report objectively. Quinn cites this as the origin of the term "New Mormon history", while citing previous efforts towards objectivity such as Juanita Brooks's 1950 publication of The Mountain Meadows Massacre by Stanford University Press.

== Sexuality ==
Deborah Laake and Colleen McDannell say that the church takes a repressive stance towards sexuality and that this may be psychologically unhealthy.

Affirmation, a Mormon LGBT organization, and Ed Decker, a critic of the LDS Church, both state that the repressive attitude of the church may—in extreme cases—lead to suicide, as in the case of 16-year-old Kip Eliason, who committed suicide because of the stresses that resulted when his church bishop told him that masturbation was sinful.

In January 1982, the church's First Presidency issued a letter to local leaders stating that they had "interpreted oral sex as constituting an unnatural, impure, or unholy practice." The letter was not distributed to the general membership. This letter also instructed local leaders not to inquire into the specifics of married members' sex lives. However, this portion of the letter was often ignored, and in response to letters of protest from members, another letter was issued to local leaders in October reiterating the prohibition on inquiring into specific sexual practices.

=== Sexual minorities ===
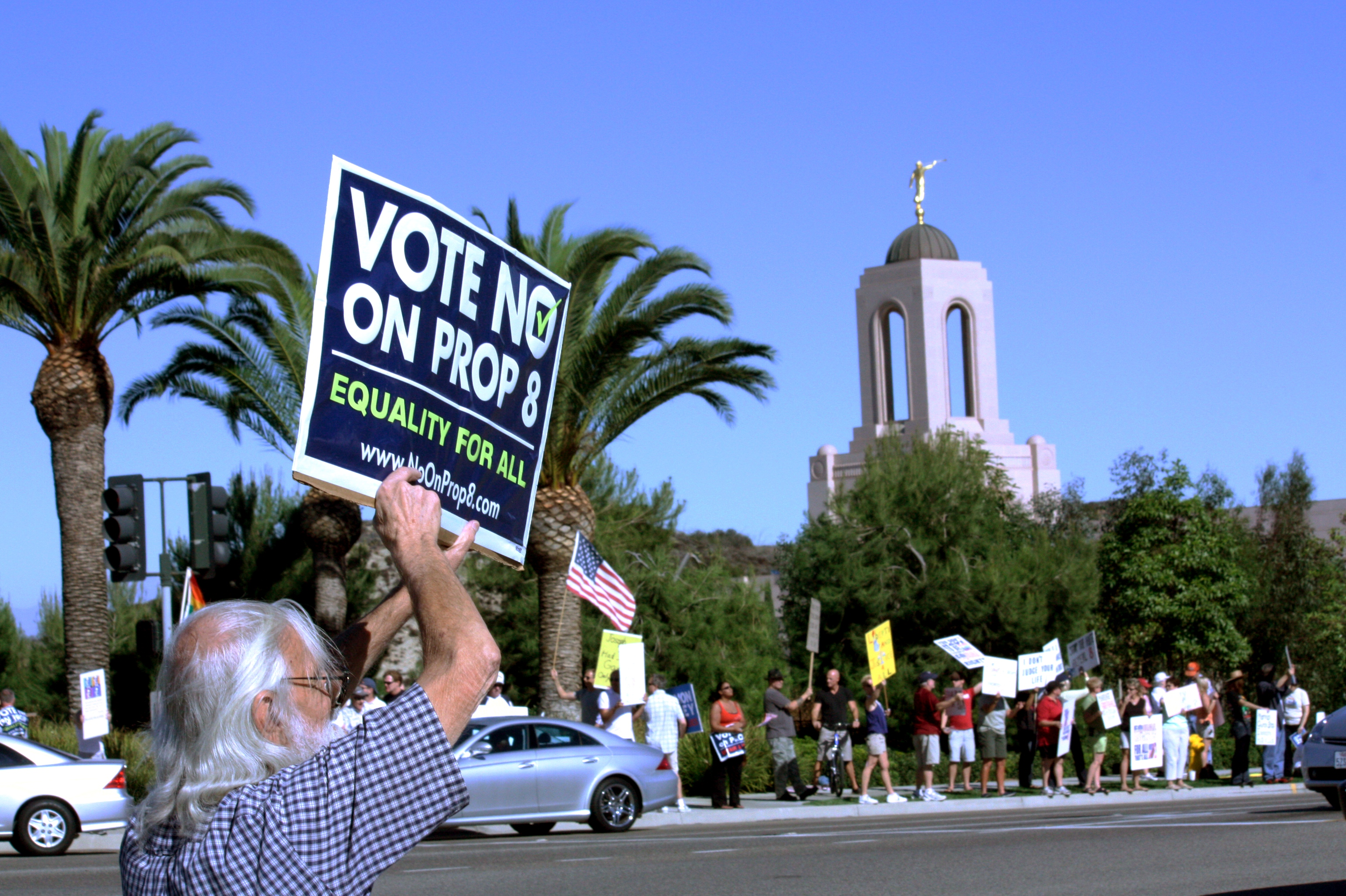
Protesters in front of the Newport Beach California Temple voicing their opposition to the church's support of Prop 8.

The church's policies and treatment of sexual minorities have long been the subject of external criticism, as well as internal controversy and disaffection by members. Because of its ban against same-sex sexual activity and same-sex marriage, the LDS church taught for decades that any adherents attracted to the same sex could and should change that through sexual orientation change efforts and righteous striving. The church provided therapy and programs for attempting to change sexual orientation.

Current teachings and policies leave homosexual members with the options of entering a mixed-orientation opposite-sex marriage, or lifelong celibacy. Some have argued that church teachings against homosexuality or non-traditional gender expressions, and the mistreatment of LGBTQ members by other adherents and leaders have contributing to their elevated rates of PTSD and depression, as well as LDS LGBTQ suicide and teen homelessness. The church's decades-long, political involvement opposing US same-sex marriage laws has further garnered criticism and protests.

== Temples ==
Many of the church's temple policies and ceremonies have been the subject of criticism; such ceremonies include an endowment, weddings, and proxy baptism for the dead.

=== Temple admission restricted ===
Richard and Joan Ostling, and Hugh F. Pyle state that the LDS Church's policy on temple admission is unreasonable, noting that even relatives cannot attend a temple marriage unless they are members of the church in good standing. The Ostlings, the Institute for Religious Research, and Jerald and Sandra Tanner say that the admission rules are unreasonable because admission to the temple requires that a church member must first declare that they pay their full tithe before they can enter a temple. The Mormonism Research Ministry calls this "coerced tithing" because church members that do not pay the full tithe cannot enter the temple, and thus cannot receive the ordinances required to receive the highest order of exaltation in the next life.

=== Baptism for the dead ===
The church teaches that a living person, acting as proxy, can be baptized by immersion on behalf of a deceased person, citing 1 Corinthians 15:29; Malachi 4:5–6; John 5:25; and 1 Peter 4:6 for doctrinal support. These baptisms for the dead are performed in temples.

Floyd C. McElveen and the Institute for Religious Research state that verses to support baptism for the dead are not justified by contextual exegesis of the Bible. In 2008, the Vatican issued a statement calling the practice "erroneous" and directing its dioceses to keep parish records from the Genealogical Society of Utah which is affiliated with the LDS Church.

Some Jewish groups criticized the LDS Church in 1995 after discovering that vicarious baptisms for the dead for victims of the Holocaust had been performed by members of the church. After that criticism, church leaders put a policy in place to stop the practice, with an exception for baptisms specifically requested or approved by victims' relatives. Jewish organizations again criticized the church in 2002, 2004, 2008, and 2012 stating that the church failed to honor the 1995 agreement. The LDS Church says it has put institutional safeguards in place to avoid the submission of the names of Holocaust victims not related to Mormon members, but that the sheer number of names submitted makes policing the database of names impractical.

=== Endowment ceremony ===
Jerald and Sandra Tanner allege that Joseph Smith copied parts of the Mormon temple endowment ceremony from Masonic rituals (such as secret handshakes, clothing, and passwords), and that this undermines the church's statement that the rituals were divinely inspired. The Tanners also point to the fact that Joseph Smith was himself a Freemason prior to introducing the endowment rituals into Mormonism.

The Tanners criticize the church's revision of the temple endowment ceremony over the years, saying that revisions were made to obscure provocative practices of the early church.

== Race ==
=== Black people ===
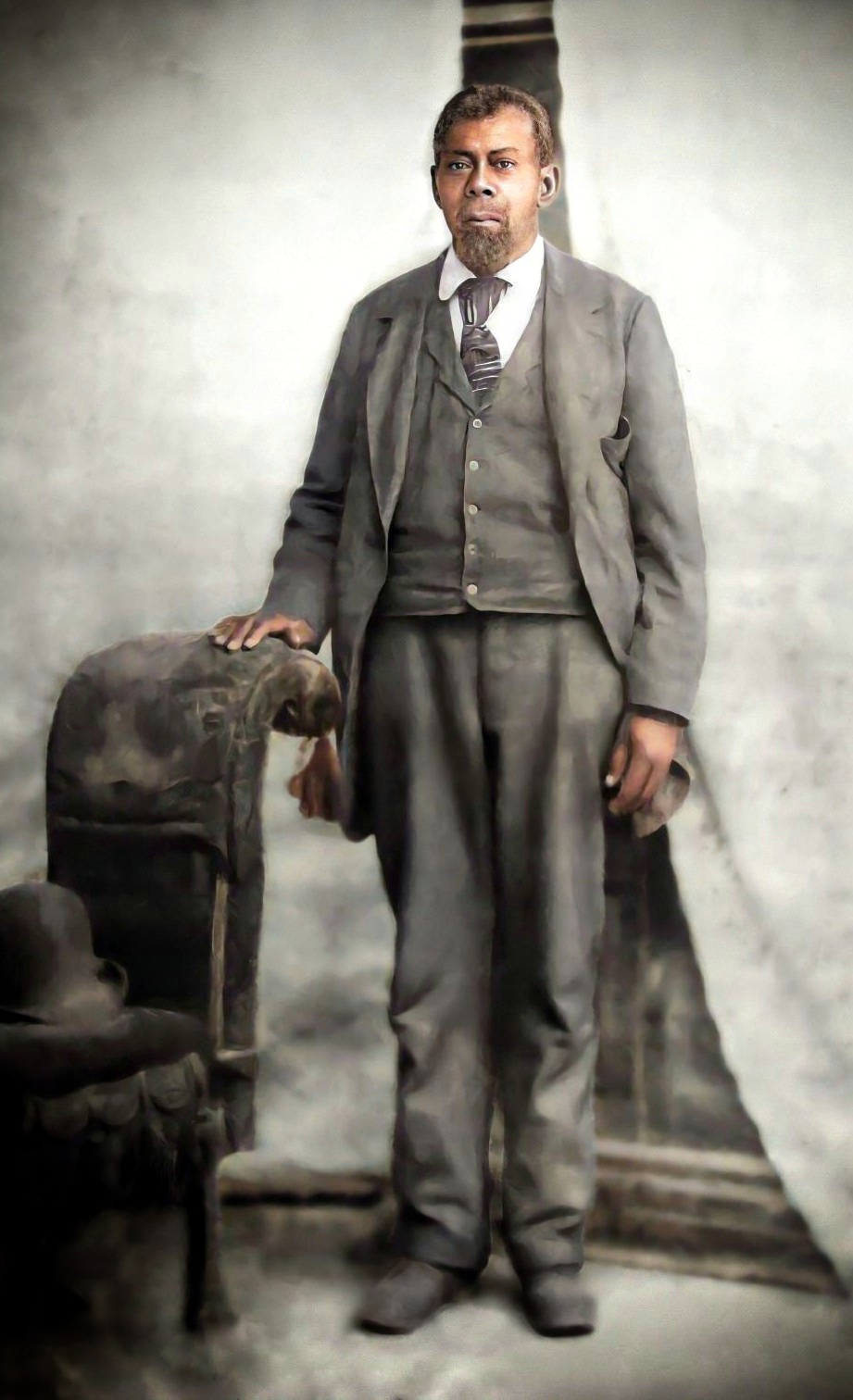
Green Flake, an enslaved Black man reported to have driven the first wagon of LDS pioneers to the Salt Lake Valley in 1847.

==== Restrictions on Black members of African descent ====
From 1852 to 1978 church policy excluded men of Black African descent from ordination to the priesthood. During the same period Black men and women were not allowed to participate in temple endowment or sealing ordinances. Richard and Joan Ostling point to the restrictions as evidence that past LDS Church policies were racist in nature. Before the change in policy, most other adult males in the LDS Church were given the priesthood. Jerald and Sandra Tanner cite quotes from church leaders such as Brigham Young, who said, "You must not think, from what I say, that I am opposed to slavery. No! The negro is damned, and is to serve his master till God chooses to remove the curse of Ham". The Tanners also illustrate church racism by quoting sections of the Book of Mormon which describe dark skin as a sign of a curse and a mark from God to distinguish a more righteous group of people from a less righteous group, and by citing passages describing white skin as "delightsome" while dark skin is portrayed as unenticing (2 Nephi 30:6).

These references in the Book of Mormon refer to those presumed to be the ancestors of Native Americans, not people of African descent. Joseph Fielding Smith, later president of the church, wrote in a 1963 letter that people with dark skin were less faithful in the pre-mortal life, and as such, did not warrant the blessings of the priesthood. The Tanners also cite other church leaders, historical and modern, who have spoken in favor of segregation and restrictions on admission to the priesthood for men of African descent.

==== Policy reversal ====
On 8 June 1978, church president Spencer W. Kimball, rescinded the restriction on priesthood ordination and extended temple worship to all worthy Latter-day Saint men and women. Also in 1978, Apostle Bruce R. McConkie told members to "[f]orget everything that I have said, or what President Brigham Young or President George Q. Cannon or whomsoever has said [about Blacks and the priesthood] .... We spoke with a limited understanding." Both the original policy and the reversal are criticized. The Tanners state that the church's 1978 policy change of allowing all worthy male members, including people of Black African descent, to hold the priesthood was not divinely inspired as the church said, but simply a matter of convenience. Richard and Joan Ostling point out that this reversal of policy occurred as the LDS Church began to expand outside the United States into countries such as Brazil that have large, ethnically mixed populations, and as the church prepared to open a new temple in São Paulo, Brazil. A few Black elders were ordained to the priesthood under Joseph Smith, who never expressed any opposition to having the priesthood available to all worthy men. The priesthood restriction originated under Brigham Young.

Gregory Prince and William Robert Wright state that these leaders were a product of their time and locale. They say that many leaders, including Smith, David O. McKay, and initially Brigham Young, were not opposed to Black men receiving the priesthood. They further state that the policy was a practice supported by Christian scripture and was not a doctrine of the church. Despite several church leaders throughout the 1950s and 1960s supporting its reversal, the policy was kept in place through 1978 because the Quorum of the Twelve Apostles felt that a revelation to the president of the church was needed to change it.

==== Calls for an apology and calls for transparency ====
Some Black members of the church and some Black critics of it have called on it to do more to apologize for the restrictions, while other black members of the church have argued against that effort. In 2004, Darron Smith, a critical Black church member, contends in his book, Black and Mormon, that the church "refuses to acknowledge and undo its racist past, and until it does that, members continue to suffer psychological damage from it" and that "the church has not done enough to rectify its racist past". The large majority of Black Mormons, however, say they are willing to look beyond the racist teachings and adhere to the church. Church president Gordon B. Hinckley gave sermons against racism. In 2005 he taught that no one who utters denigrating remarks can consider himself a true disciple of Christ, and noted the irony of racial claims to the Melchizedek priesthood.

In 2003, Richard Abanes contended that the church tries to hide past racial practices, citing the 1981 change in the Book of Mormon, which stated that the Lamanites had become "a white and a delightsome people" to "a pure and a delightsome people" (2 Nephi 30:6). In 1840, the "white and delightsome" of the original Book of Mormon text was changed by Joseph Smith to "pure and delightsome" in the third edition; it reverted to "white and delightsome" after Smith's death in subsequent editions, as editions were based on one published in England. In 1981, the First Presidency approved a change that adopted the 1840 version by Smith, as saying that converts would become "pure and delightsome". (Note: The wording "white and a delightsome" was introduced in the 1st edition of the Book of Mormon in 1830. This was changed to "pure and a delightsome" in the 3rd edition in 1840. The 1841 and 1849 European editions of the Book of Mormon were printed in England by the Twelve Apostles, and were the Kirtland 2nd edition with Anglicized spellings. Future LDS editions were based on the European editions until the church issued a major reworking in 1981.)

==== Recent scrutiny and church response ====
Criticisms for the past policies on race discrimination were renewed during the 2012 presidential campaign of Mitt Romney and in 2018 surrounding the 40th anniversary of the lifting of race restrictions. The church published the following statement in December 2013:

Today, the Church disavows the theories advanced in the past that black skin is a sign of divine disfavor or curse, or that it reflects unrighteous actions in a premortal life; that mixed-race marriages are a sin; or that blacks or people of any other race or ethnicity are inferior in any way to anyone else. Church leaders today unequivocally condemn all racism, past and present, in any form.

In an October 2020 General Conference address following the George Floyd protests, church president Russell M. Nelson publicly condemned racism and called upon all church members to abandon attitudes and actions of prejudice. A 2023 survey of over 1,000 former church members in the Mormon corridor found race issues in the church was the third most commonly cited criticisms that led to disaffiliation.

=== Native American people ===
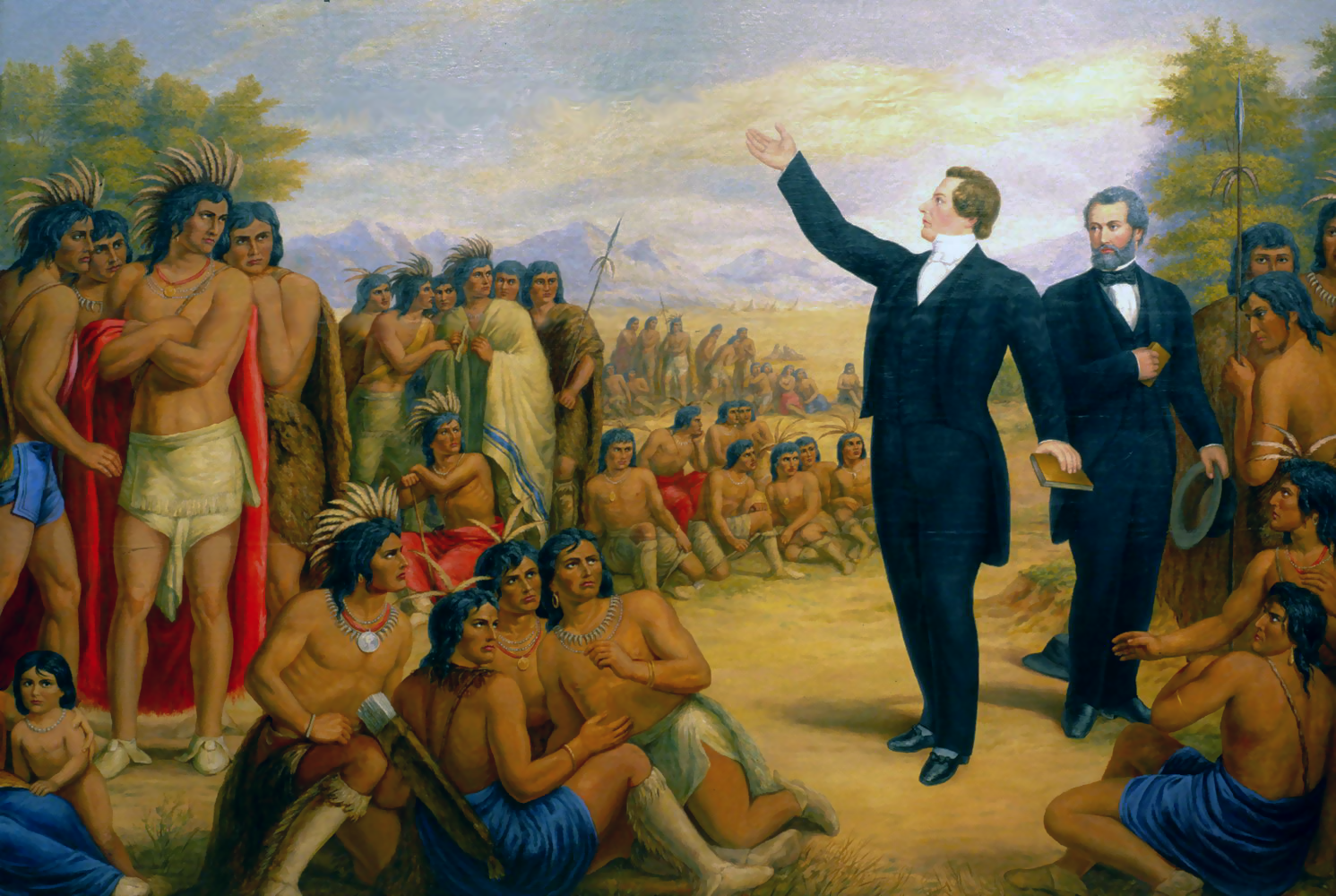
Artistic depiction of Joseph Smith preaching to Native Americans in Illinois.

Over the past two centuries, the relationship between Native American people and the LDS Church has included friendly ties, displacement, battles, slavery, education placement programs, official and unofficial discrimination, and criticism. Church leadership and publications taught the belief that Native Americans are descendants of Lamanites, a dark-skinned and cursed group of people who are described in the Book of Mormon. More recently, LDS researchers and publications generally favor a smaller geographic footprint of Lamanite descendants. (Note: Prior to 2006, the introduction to church-published editions of the Book of Mormon stated Lamanites form the "principal ancestors of the American Indians." Since the 2006 edition, the same passage now reads they are "among the ancestors of the American Indians.") There is no direct support amongst mainstream historians and archaeologists for the historicity of the Book of Mormon or Middle Eastern origins for any Native American peoples.

Soon after Mormons colonized the Salt Lake Valley in 1847, Native American child slaves became a vital source of their labor, and were exchanged as gifts. The settlers initially had some peaceful relations, but because resources were scarce in the desert, hostilities broke out with the local Native Americans. According to LDS Church Historian Marlin K. Jensen as more LDS immigrants arrived and took over the land of Native nations, "Resources the Indians had relied on for generations diminished, and in time they felt forced to resist and fight for their own survival ... the land and cultural birthright Indians once possessed in the Great Basin were largely taken from them." Within 50 years of Mormon settlement, the population of Utah's Native Americans was reduced by almost 90%.

The church ran an Indian Placement Program between the 1950s and the 1990s, wherein indigenous children were adopted by white church members. Criticism resulted during and after the program, including accusations of improper assimilation and even abuse. However, many of the involved students and families praised the program. Church leaders taught for decades that Native Americans' darker skin would be made lighter due to their righteousness.

== Gender bias and sexism ==
Richard and Joan Ostling argue that the LDS Church treats women as inferior to men. The Cult Awareness and Information Centre also point to comments such as those made by church leader Bruce R. McConkie, who wrote in 1966 that a "woman's primary place is in the home, where she is to rear children and abide by the righteous counsel of her husband". The First Presidency and the Quorum of the Twelve espouse a complementarian view of gender roles.

Claudia Lauper Bushman notes that, in the 1970s and 1980s, "just as American women pressed for greater influence", the LDS Church decreased the visibility and responsibilities of women in various areas including welfare, leadership, training, publishing, and policy setting. Despite this, Bushman asserts, "most LDS women tend to be good-natured and pragmatic: they work on the things that they can change and forget the rest."

Jerald and Sandra Tanner point to comments by certain church leaders as evidence that women are subject to different rules regarding entry into heaven. They state that 19th-century leader Erastus Snow preached: "No woman will get into the celestial kingdom, except her husband receives her, if she is worthy to have a husband; and if not, somebody will receive her as a servant". In Mormon doctrine, celestial marriage is a prerequisite for exaltation for members of either gender.

Those who adopt humanist or feminist perspectives may view certain alleged or former LDS Church doctrines (including the spiritual status of blacks, polygamy, and the role of women in society) as racist or sexist.

== Gender minorities ==
Transgender, non-binary, intersex, and other gender minorities whose gender identity and expression differ from the cisgender (i.e. non-transgender) majority currently face membership restrictions in access to priesthood and temple rites. Gender identity and roles play an important part in Mormon theology which teaches a strict binary of spiritual gender as literal offspring of heterosexual, cisgender Heavenly Parents.

Author Charlotte Scholl Shurtz stated that the focus on God as a cisgender, heterosexual couple excludes transgender, nonbinary, and intersex members and enshrines cisnormativity. She further said that current teachings ignore transgender and intersex people and deny exaltation and godhood to non-cisgender individuals. Author Duane Jeffery criticized LDS teachings around intersex individuals as falling short on including real-world biological complexity. Kimberly Anderson, an LDS intersex person, stated that the existence of intersex people shatters the church's gender-binary hierarchy and plan of salvation. LDS urologist Dr. David Hatch stated that if top church leaders say gender is permanent and eternal then they can't include intersex people which creates a conflict.

== Allegations of sexual abuse coverup ==
On December 28, 2020, seven lawsuits were filed against the LDS Church, based on allegations which stated that it covered up decades of sexual abuse among its Boy Scouts of America (BSA) troops in Arizona. On September 15, 2021, it was agreed that the BSA, which the church ended affiliation with in 2020, would receive an estimated $250 million in settlements from the church. The church had been the BSA's largest single sponsor.

== Apologetic responses ==
Mormon apologetics organizations, such as FAIR and the Maxwell Institute, seek to counter criticisms of the church and its leaders. Most of the apologetic work focuses on providing and discussing evidence supporting the statements of Smith and the Book of Mormon. Some well known LDS apologist scholars and authors include Hugh Nibley and Daniel Peterson. The Foundation for Ancient Research and Mormon Studies (FARMS) was an apologetic organization before being absorbed into the Maxwell Institute in 2006.

== Trademark lawsuit ==
In September 2005, John Dehlin created the Mormon Stories podcast as an open discussion of Mormon issues with the intention of giving listeners reasons to remain in the church. Dehlin was excommunicated for apostasy by the LDS Church in 2015.

In 2018, then-LDS Church president Russell M. Nelson urged church members to stop using the term "Mormon", calling its usage "a victory for Satan". In 2025, Nelson died and was replaced by Dallin H. Oaks, a longtime advocate of church trademarks. In 2026, the church sued the Mormon Stories Podcast alleging trademark and copyright infringement. The church denied the lawsuit was an "attempt to silence critics". The ACLU and the EFF filed amicus briefs in support of "Mormon Stories Podcast". Those supporting the podcast note that the LDS Church does not have exclusive rights to the term "Mormon", as numerous other denominations are also rightly called "Mormon", including the Community of Christ and Fundamentalist Church of Jesus Christ of Latter-Day Saints.

== See also ==
- Anti-Mormonism
- Criticism of Mormon sacred texts
- Fundamentalist Church of Jesus Christ of Latter-Day Saints: Criticism
