= Criticism of Mormon sacred texts =

The standard works of Mormonism—the largest denomination of which is the Church of Jesus Christ of Latter-day Saints (LDS Church)—have been the subject of various criticisms. Latter-day Saints believe the Book of Mormon is a sacred text with the same divine authority as the Bible; both are considered complementary to each other. Other Mormon sacred texts include the Pearl of Great Price and Doctrine and Covenants, which are also recognized as scripture. Religious and scholarly critics outside Mormonism have disputed Mormonism's unique scriptures, questioning the traditional narrative of how these books came to light and the extent to which they describe actual events. Critics cite research in history, archeology, and other disciplines to support their contentions.

== Book of Mormon ==
=== Origin ===
There are several theories as to the origin of the Book of Mormon. Most adherents of Mormonism view the book as a work of inspired scripture. The most common theory accepted by adherents is that promoted by Joseph Smith, who said he translated the work from an ancient set of golden plates inscribed by prophets. Smith said he discovered these near his home in Palmyra, New York, in the 1820s after being told to go there by the angel Moroni and translated them "by the gift and power of God". Besides Smith himself, there were 11 witnesses who said they physically saw the plates in 1829 (three stating they were visited by an angel as well). Several other witnesses, some of them friendly to Smith and some hostile, observed him dictating the text that eventually became the Book of Mormon.

Nevertheless, critics have explored a number of issues, including (1) whether Smith actually had golden plates, or whether the text of the Book of Mormon originated in his mind or through inspiration; (2) whether it was Smith himself who composed the book's text, or whether an associate of Smith's such as Oliver Cowdery or Sidney Rigdon could have composed the text; and (3) whether the book was based on a prior work such as the View of the Hebrews, the Spalding Manuscript, or the Bible.

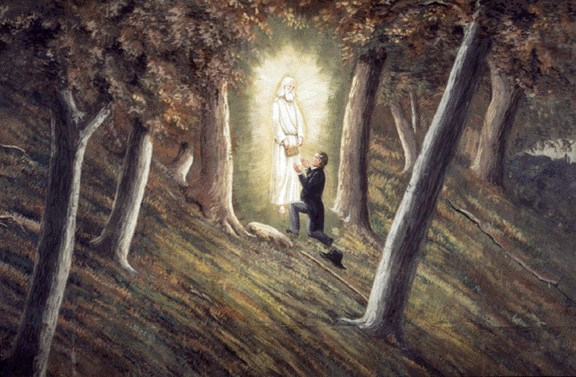
A painting of Joseph Smith Jr. receiving the golden plates from the angel Moroni

==== Existence of golden plates ====
Two separate sets of witnesses—a set of three and a set of eight—testified as having seen the golden plates, the record from which the Book of Mormon was translated. Critics, including Jerald and Sandra Tanner and the Institute for Religious Research (IRR), note several pieces of evidence that, they argue, call into question the authenticity of the experience. These include letters and affidavits in which Martin Harris stated that the Eight Witnesses never saw the plates, and that his own witness was more spiritual than physical. Additionally, each of the Three Witnesses (Harris, Cowdery, and David Whitmer) left the church during Smith's lifetime and considered Smith to have been a fallen prophet.

Apologists note that the witnesses in most cases affirmed their witness until their death, and claim that the aforementioned affidavits and letters are either fraudulent, or otherwise not reliable. In 1881, Whitmer, the one witness who never returned to the church, issued an affidavit reaffirming his testimony of the experience.

==== Plagiarism ====
Richard Abanes, the Tanners, and others state that Smith plagiarized the Book of Mormon, and that it is therefore not divinely inspired. Alleged sources include View of the Hebrews by Ethan Smith (published 1823, seven years before the Book of Mormon); The Wonders of Nature by Josiah Priest (published in 1826, four years before the Book of Mormon); the Bible; and the Apocrypha. LDS Church leaders Bruce R. McConkie and Spencer W. Kimball counter that repetition from previous texts validates the Book of Mormon because it shows God's consistency and equal revelation to all peoples and fulfills prophecy. Moreover, they argue that warnings need to be repeated in the face of ageless problems.

=== Historicity ===
The Book of Mormon purports to be a record of an ancient Israelite migration to the New World. For most adherents of the movement, Book of Mormon historicity is a matter of faith. For others, its historicity is not accepted, and specific claims made in the Book of Mormon have been questioned from a number of different perspectives. Critics of the historical and scientific claims of the Book of Mormon tend to focus on four main areas:

- The lack of correlation between locations described in the Book of Mormon and American archaeological sites.
- Anachronistic references to animals, plants, metals and technologies in the Book of Mormon that archaeological or scientific studies have found no evidence of in post-Pleistocene, pre-Columbian America. Items typically listed include cattle, horses, asses, oxen, sheep, swine, goats, elephants, wheat, steel, brass, chains, iron, scimitars, and chariots.
- The lack of linguistic connection between any Native American languages and Near Eastern languages.
- The lack of current DNA evidence linking any Native American group to the ancient Near East.

Within the Latter Day Saint movement, there have been many apologetical counter claims attempting to reconcile these apparent discrepancies. Among those apologetic groups, a great deal of research has been done by the Foundation for Ancient Research and Mormon Studies (FARMS), and Foundation for Apologetic Information & Research (FAIR), in an attempt to either prove the veracity of Book of Mormon claims, or to counter arguments critical to its historicity.

==== Archaeology ====
Since the introduction of the Book of Mormon in 1830, both Mormon and non-Mormon archaeologists have studied its claims in reference to known archaeological evidence. Latter Day Saints generally believe that the Book of Mormon describes historical events; however, the existence of the civilizations and people described in the Book of Mormon is not accepted by mainstream historians or archaeologists.

The Book of Mormon contains an account of peoples who, in succeeding groups between 2500 BC and 600 BC, traveled from the Middle East and settled in the Americas. Evangelical lecturer and journalist Richard Abanes and author David Persuitte argue that aspects of the Book of Mormon narrative (such as the existence of horses, steel, and chariots in pre-Columbian America) are not supported by mainstream archaeology. Apologist Michael R. Ash, of FAIR, counters that obtaining archaeological evidence to prove or disprove specific ancient events is difficult. Joseph Allen, along with other LDS scholars, have found sites in Mesoamerica that they believe may represent ancient Book of Mormon cities. John L. Sorenson does not dispute that other peoples may have been present in the Americas concurrent with Book of Mormon peoples (see limited geography model).

==== Genetics ====
A traditional Mormon hypothesis of the origin of Native Americans is that they are descended solely from Hebrews in Jerusalem. Scientist Yaakov Kleiman, Mormon anthropologist Thomas W. Murphy, and ex-Mormon molecular biologist Simon Southerton argue that this hypothesis is inconsistent with recent genetic findings, which show the genetic origins of Native Americans to be in Central Asia, possibly near the Altay Mountains. FARMS counters that testing and drawing generalizations from this hypothesis alone is an overly simplistic approach, and that the resulting conclusions would not stand up under peer review. In addition, the traditional Mormon hypothesis under test may itself be based on assumptions unsupported by the Book of Mormon narrative (see limited geography model).

Writing in FARMS, apologist David A. McClellan concludes it is not probable that "the genetic signature of a small migrating family from 2,600 years ago" can be recovered.

==== Linguistics ====
Critics Jerald and Sandra Tanner and Marvin W. Cowan contend that the Book of Mormon's use of certain linguistic anachronisms (such as the Americanized name "Sam" and the French word "adieu") provide evidence that the book was fabricated by Joseph Smith, rather than divinely inspired. In addition, Richard Abanes argues that because the first edition of the Book of Mormon contained hundreds of grammatical errors (removed in later editions), the book was therefore fabricated by Smith and not divinely inspired.

== Book of Abraham ==
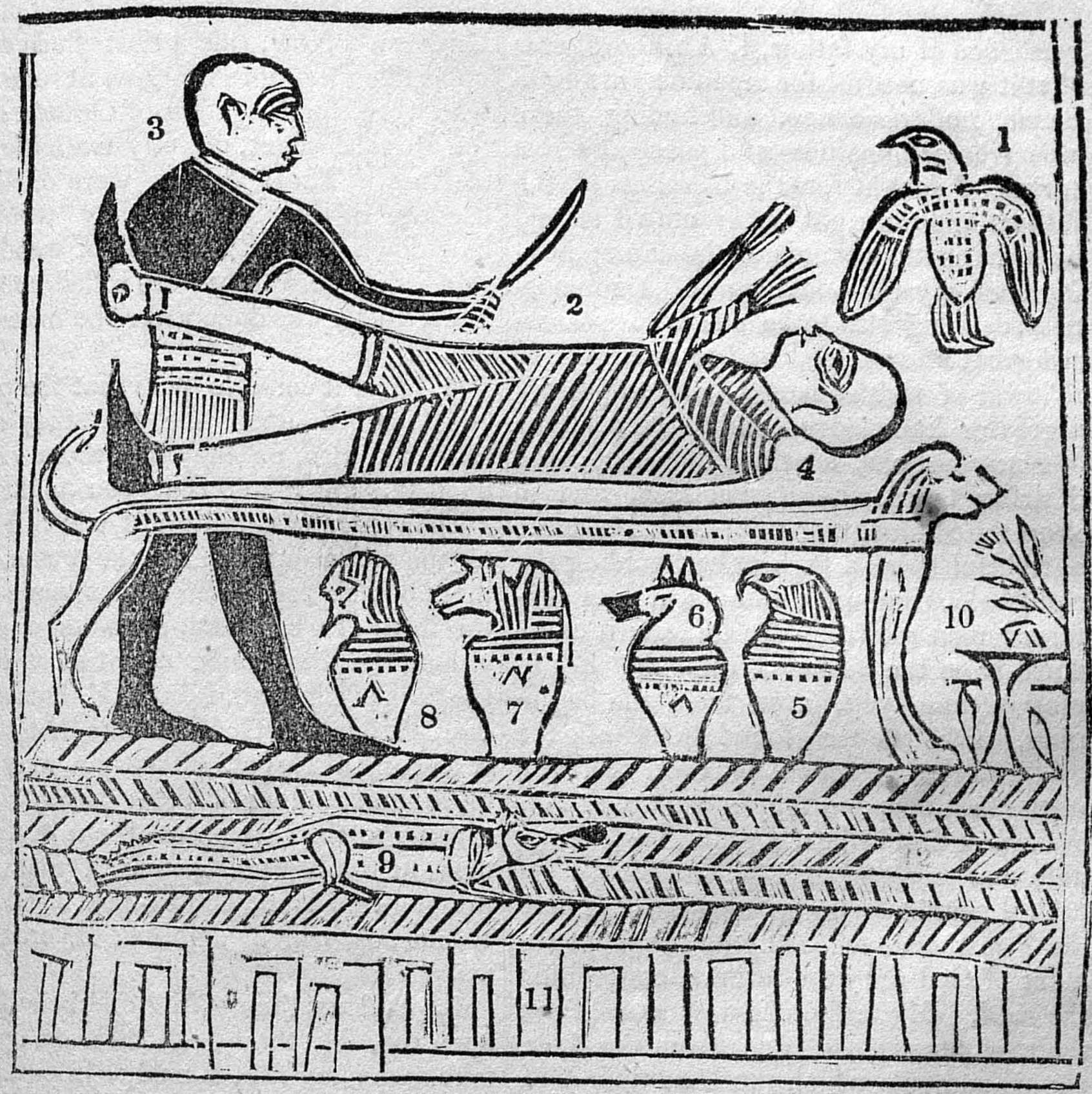
Facsimile No. 1 from the Book of Abraham

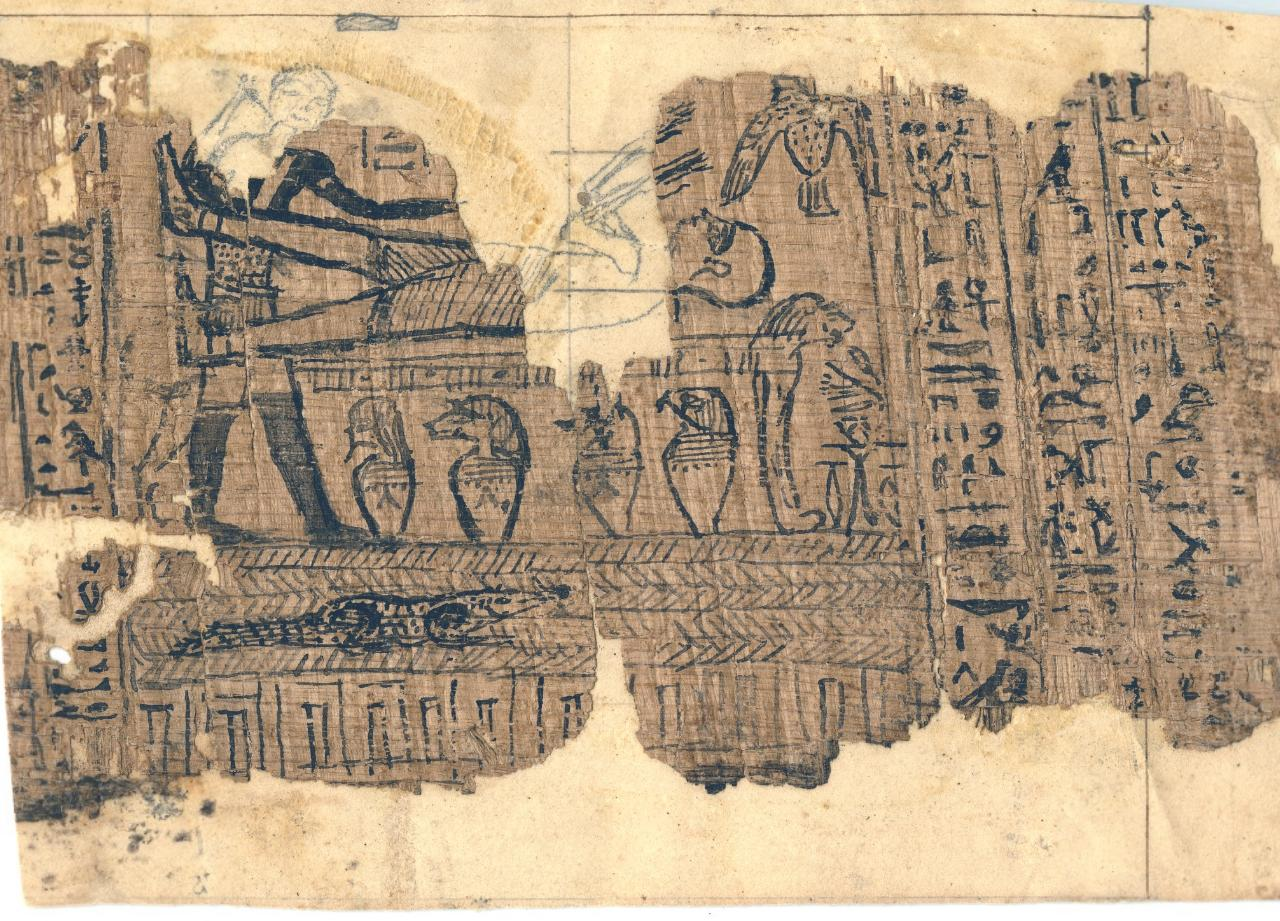
Extant papyri showing original vignette considered the source of Facsimile 1. Note the lacuna, or missing portions of the vignette.

The Book of Abraham differs from the other Mormon sacred texts in that some of the original source material has been examined by independent experts.

The Institute for Religious Research and the Tanners say that Smith fraudulently represented the Book of Abraham, part of the church's scriptural canon, as a divine document. Richard and Joan Ostling note that non-Latter Day Saint scholars have concluded that translations of surviving papyri which they believe are portions of the source of the Book of Abraham are unrelated to the content of the book's text. Joseph Smith states he came into the possession of several Egyptian papyri, from which he claimed to translate the Book of Abraham, part of the modern Pearl of Great Price. The papyri were lost for many years, but in the late 1960s, portions of the papyri were discovered. The extant papyri, as well as the facsimiles preserved by Smith in the Pearl of Great Price, have been translated by modern Egyptologists, and have been conclusively shown to be common Egyptian funerary documents unrelated to the content of the Book of Abraham. Mormon scholars Michael D. Rhodes and John Gee came to the same conclusion, but argue that Smith may have been using the papyri as inspiration.

=== General statements by Egyptologists ===
Sometime in 1856, Theodule Deveria, an Egyptologist at the Louvre, had the opportunity to examine the facsimiles published as part of the Book of Abraham. His interpretation, juxtaposed with Smith's interpretation, was published in T. B. H. Stenhouse's book The Rocky Mountain Saints: A Full and Complete History of the Mormons in 1873. Additionally, later in 1912, Reverend Franklin S. Spalding sent copies of the three facsimiles to eight Egyptologists and Semitists soliciting their interpretation of the facsimiles, the results of which were published in Spalding's work Joseph Smith, Jr. As a Translator. Deveria, and each of the eight scholars immediately recognized the facsimiles as portions of ordinary funerary documents, and some harshly condemned Smith's interpretation, as shown below:

Egyptologist Dr. James H. Breasted, of the University of Chicago noted:

these three facsimiles of Egyptian documents in the "Pearl of Great Price" depict the most common objects in the Mortuary religion of Egypt. Joseph Smith's interpretations of them as part of a unique revelation through Abraham, therefore, very clearly demonstrates that he was totally unacquainted with the significance of these documents and absolutely ignorant of the simplest facts of Egyptian writing and civilization.

Dr. W. M. Flinders Petrie of London University wrote: "It may be safely said that there is not one single word that is true in these explanations"

Dr. A. H. Sayce, Oxford professor of Egyptology: "It is difficult to deal seriously with Joseph Smith's impudent fraud.... Smith has turned the goddess [Isis in Facsimile No. 3] into a king and Osiris into Abraham."

== Doctrine and Covenants ==
Unlike the other Mormon scriptures, the Doctrine and Covenants does not purport to be an ancient manuscript, but is instead composed of revelations received by modern prophets and other documents of instruction to church members. There has been criticism of apparent revision, omission and addition of material in it.

=== Book of Commandments ===
A number of sections were changed between the 1833 Book of Commandments and the 1835 Doctrine and Covenants. In his 1887 Whitmerite tract An Address to All Believers in Christ, David Whitmer of the Three Witnesses criticised these changes, asserting that in some places "the meaning is entirely changed on some very important matters; as if the Lord had changed his mind a few years after he gave the revelations".

In support of his view that Joseph Smith had been called of God to translate the Book of Mormon but subsequently started teaching false doctrine, Whitmer particularly highlighted that chapter 4 of the Book of Commandments states that Joseph Smith "has a gift to translate the Book and I have commanded him that he shall pretend to no other gift, for I will grant him no other gift", while the Doctrine and Covenants (now D&C 5:4) changes it to "you have a gift to translate the plates; and this is the first gift that I bestowed upon you; and I have commanded that you should pretend to no other gift until my purpose is fulfilled in this; for I will grant unto you no other gift until it is finished".

The Church of Christ (Temple Lot) also regards these changes as being apostate. In the foreword to their 1950 tract "The Book of Commandments Controversy Reviewed", Apostle Clarence L. Wheaton and Angela Wheaton describe the revelations having been "mutilated and changed almost beyond recognition so as to include provisions for doctrines and officers that were not provided for in the original version", asserting that the versions in the original Book of Commandments agreed with the Bible and Book of Mormon, and describing the versions in the Doctrine and Covenants as teaching "an apostate form of doctrine and organisation".

LDS apologists generally contend that the revisions were by inspiration. For example, an article in the January 2013 issue of LDS Church's Ensign magazine claims that "[...] Joseph was inspired to update the contents of the revelations to reflect a growing Church structure and new circumstances", citing a November 1831 conference resolution to this effect.

=== Plural marriage ===
In 1876, as part of a larger re-ordering, re-numbering and expansion of the Doctrine and Covenants, section 101 from the 1835 edition (and subsequent printings) was removed. Section 101 was a "Statement on Marriage" as adopted by a conference of the church, and contained the following text:

Inasmuch as this Church of Christ has been reproached with the crime of fornication and polygamy, we declare that we believe that one man should have one wife, and one woman but one husband, except in the case of death, when either is at liberty to marry again.

At the same time, the 1843 polygamy revelation was added, designated section 132 of the modern LDS edition, which contains a revelation recorded by Smith on eternal marriage and teaches the doctrine of plural marriage. It refers to Abraham, David and Solomon as biblical precedents, saying of David:

David's wives and concubines were given unto him of me, by the hand of Nathan, my servant, and others of the prophets who had the keys of this power; and in none of these things did he sin against me save in the case of Uriah and his wife;

The Community of Christ, formerly the Reorganized Church of Jesus Christ of Latter Day Saints (RLDS Church) retains the original section 101 (now as section 111), and has traditionally disputed the authenticity of the 1843 revelation. In a tract listing doctrinal differences between the churches, RLDS presiding patriarch Elbert A. Smith argued that the precedent of David and Solomon contradicts the Bible and Book of Mormon, since Deuteronomy 17:17 prohibits the king from taking a large number of wives, and Jacob 2:33 (RLDS versification; LDS Jacob 2:24) states "David and Solomon truly had many wives and concubines, which thing was abominable before me, saith the Lord."

Regarding this apparent contradiction, LDS apologists argue that David's sin referred to by Jacob was the murder of Uriah the Hittite and taking of an unapproved wife, and that Solomon's sin was allowing his wives to lead him astray.

Followers of Denver Snuffer also do not use LDS D&C 132. A 2017 revelation recorded by Snuffer describes it as an "altered document", and asserts that the covenant of celestial marriage established for Adam and Eve and their posterity is between one man and one woman. It, however, affirms the teaching that temporal marriage falls outside of this covenant, and that this covenant is a prerequisite for exaltation, listing Abraham and Sarah, Isaac and Rebekah, and Jacob and Rachel as couples enthroned through celestial marriage.

=== Lectures of Faith ===
In 1921, the LDS Church removed the "Lectures on Faith" portion of the book, with an explanation that the Lectures "were never presented to nor accepted by the Church as being otherwise than theological lectures or lessons". The Lectures contain theology concerning the Godhead and emphasize the importance of faith and works.

=== Other ===
Until 1981, editions of the book used code names for certain people and places in those sections that dealt with the United Order. The 1981 LDS edition replaced these with the real names, relegating the code names to footnotes. The Community of Christ edition still uses the code names.

Some of the material in the Doctrine and Covenants relates to the production of the Book of Mormon, for which see above.

== Joseph Smith Translation and Book of Moses ==
The LDS Church includes Joseph Smith–Matthew (an extract from Smith's revision of the Gospel of Matthew) and the Book of Moses (an extract from Smith's revision of the Book of Genesis) as part of the Pearl of Great Price. However, it has not canonized the Joseph Smith Translation of the Bible in its entirety. The entire translation is, however, used by the Community of Christ. Several critics and linguists have noted areas where the translation appears to have been faulty. In 2017 BYU professor Thomas Wayment and graduate student Haley Wilson announced they had discovered a textual dependence of the Joseph Smith Translation on a popular 18th century bible commentary by Adam Clarke.

== See also ==
- Account of John
- Criticism of the Latter Day Saint movement
- The Book of Joseph
- Kinderhook plates
- The Book of Mormon and the King James Bible
- Reformed Egyptian

== Sources ==
- Abanes, Richard (2003), One Nation Under Gods: A History of the Mormon Church, Thunder's Mouth Press, ISBN 1-56858-283-8
- Beckwith, Francis (2002), The New Mormon Challenge, Zondervan, ISBN 0-310-23194-9
- Bennett, John C. (1842), The History of the Saints; or An Exposé of Joe Smith and Mormonism, Boston: Leland & Whiting, ISBN 978-0-252-02589-1.
- Brodie, Fawn M. (1995), No Man Knows My History: The Life of Joseph Smith, Vintage, ISBN 0-679-73054-0
- Howe, Eber D. (1834), Mormonism unvailed or, A faithful account of that singular imposition and delusion, from its rise to the present time Online copy
- Krakauer, Jon (2003), Under the Banner of Heaven: A Story of Violent Faith, Doubleday, ISBN 0-385-50951-0
- Newell, Linda King (1994), Mormon Enigma: Emma Hale Smith (2nd ed.), University of Illinois Press, pp. 89, 132, ISBN 0-252-06291-4 (Online Copy)
- Ostling, Richard and Joan (1999), Mormon America, Harper Collins, ISBN 0-06-066371-5
- Persuitte, David (2000), Joseph Smith and the Origins of the Book of Mormon (2nd ed.), McFarland & Company, ISBN 0-7864-0826-X
- Smith, Andrew F. (1971), The Saintly Scoundrel: The Life and Times of Dr. John Cook Bennett, Urbana and Chicago: University of Illinois Press, p. 141, ISBN 978-0-252-02282-1.
- Stenhouse, T. B. H. (1878), The Rocky Mountain Saints: A Full and Complete History of the Mormons, New York: D. Appleton and Company.
- Tanner, Jerald and Sandra (1979), The Changing World of Mormonism, Moody Press, ISBN 0-8024-1234-3
- Tanner, Jerald and Sandra (1987), Mormonism - Shadow or Reality?, Utah Lighthouse Ministry, ISBN 99930-74-43-8
- Tucker, Pomeroy (1867), Origin, rise, and progress of Mormonism: biography of its founders and history of its church, Scholarly Publishing Office, University of Michigan Library, ISBN 1-4255-3152-0
- Van Wagoner, Richard S. (1986), "Sarah Pratt: The Shaping of an Apostate", Dialogue: A Journal of Mormon Thought, 19 (2): 69–99, doi:10.2307/45225431, JSTOR 45225431, archived from the original on 2009-02-21.
- Wolverton, Susan (2004), Having Visions: The Book of Mormon: Translated and Exposed in Plain English, Algora, ISBN 0-87586-310-8
- Wymetal, Wilhelm Ritter von (1886), Joseph Smith, the Prophet, His Family, and His Friends: A Study Based on Facts and Documents, Salt Lake City, UT: Tribune Printing and Publishing Company, pp. 60–61.
