= Gospel Principles =

1978 book

- The 2009 edition of the book.
- Language: English (original) (available in ~50 languages)
- Publisher: The Church of Jesus Christ of Latter-day Saints
- Publication date: 1978, 2009
- Publication place: United States
- Pages: 290 (2009)

Gospel Principles is a book that sets out some of the basic doctrines and teachings of the Church of Jesus Christ of Latter-day Saints (LDS Church). The book is published by the LDS Church and is provided to its members as a personal study guide and as a church lesson manual.

== History ==
Gospel Principles was first published in English in 1978. Subsequent editions, each with minor revisions, were published in 1979, 1981, 1985, 1986, 1988, 1992, 1995, and 1997. The book has traditionally been used as a Sunday School lesson manual for attendees who are recent converts or non-members of the church.

In 2009, the LDS Church published a revised edition of the book and mandated that it be used twice-monthly as the lesson manual for Sunday Relief Society and Melchizedek priesthood classes in 2010 and 2011.

== Content ==
Gospel Principles is designed to be both a personal study guide and as a teacher's manual. The book is divided into 47 chapters. Each chapter sets out a basic doctrine or teaching of the LDS Church in simple language. Supporting scriptural references to the standard works are included in each chapter, as are sample questions that a teacher could ask in a class setting. The book also contains color illustrations.

The chapters have not changed between the 1979 and 2009 editions, but some content has been revised. Mormonism Research Ministry, a Christian organization that opposes the teachings of the LDS Church, has compiled a list of changes in the various editions of the book.

== Availability ==
Gospel Principles is published by the LDS Church and is available for purchase from the church and through some private LDS-related bookstores. The book's contents are also available for free on the church's Internet website. The text of Gospel Principles is copyrighted by Intellectual Reserve, a corporation that holds the intellectual properties of the LDS Church.

== See also ==
- Teachings of Presidents of the Church
