= Deborah Laake =

American writer (1952-2000)

Deborah Laake (April 19, 1952 – February 6, 2000) was a columnist at the Dallas Morning News in the 1980s and later a staff writer, columnist, editor, and executive at the Phoenix New Times. She was famous for her 1993 book entitled Secret Ceremonies: A Mormon Woman's Intimate Diary of Marriage and Beyond, a candid and critical account of her experiences growing up and marrying as a member of the Church of Jesus Christ of Latter-day Saints (LDS Church).

== Biography ==
Laake was born Deborah Elsbeth Legler in Phoenix, Arizona. She was raised as a member of the LDS Church and attended Brigham Young University. After she stopped practicing the religion, she published the book Secret Ceremonies. In the book she describes her childhood, her marriage, her divorce and the temple ceremonies in the LDS Church. She also blames the church "for her inability to enjoy marital intercourse, for her three failed marriages, for her attempted suicide, and for the two months she spent in a psychiatric institution". The book was a commercial success; it spent 15 weeks on the New York Times best-seller list and over 500,000 copies were printed. Writing in Religion News Service, Jana Riess characterizes Secret Ceremonies as a "go-for-the-jugular exposé" typical of the ex-Mormon memoirs of her era.

Shortly after the book's publication Laake was excommunicated for apostasy because of her criticisms and also for her "detailed revelation of top-secret Mormon temple ceremonies". In 1994, Laake was diagnosed with breast cancer. In 2000, she committed suicide by "ingesting an overdose of pills" in Charleston, South Carolina. At the time of her death; Laake was being actively treated for depression. According to her friend and former coworker Terry Green Sterling, this depression was severe and it began several years prior to the suicide.

== Awards ==
She received various awards throughout her career. In 1983, she won a special citation from the University of Missouri for her feature writing. Also in 1983, the Columbia School of Journalism gave Laake a special award for her short story "Wormboys". In 1987 she won Arizona's feature column writing award. In 1988, she was elected Arizona's "Journalist of the Year" and won the National Headliner award in 1991.
