= Book of Joseph =

Ancient text

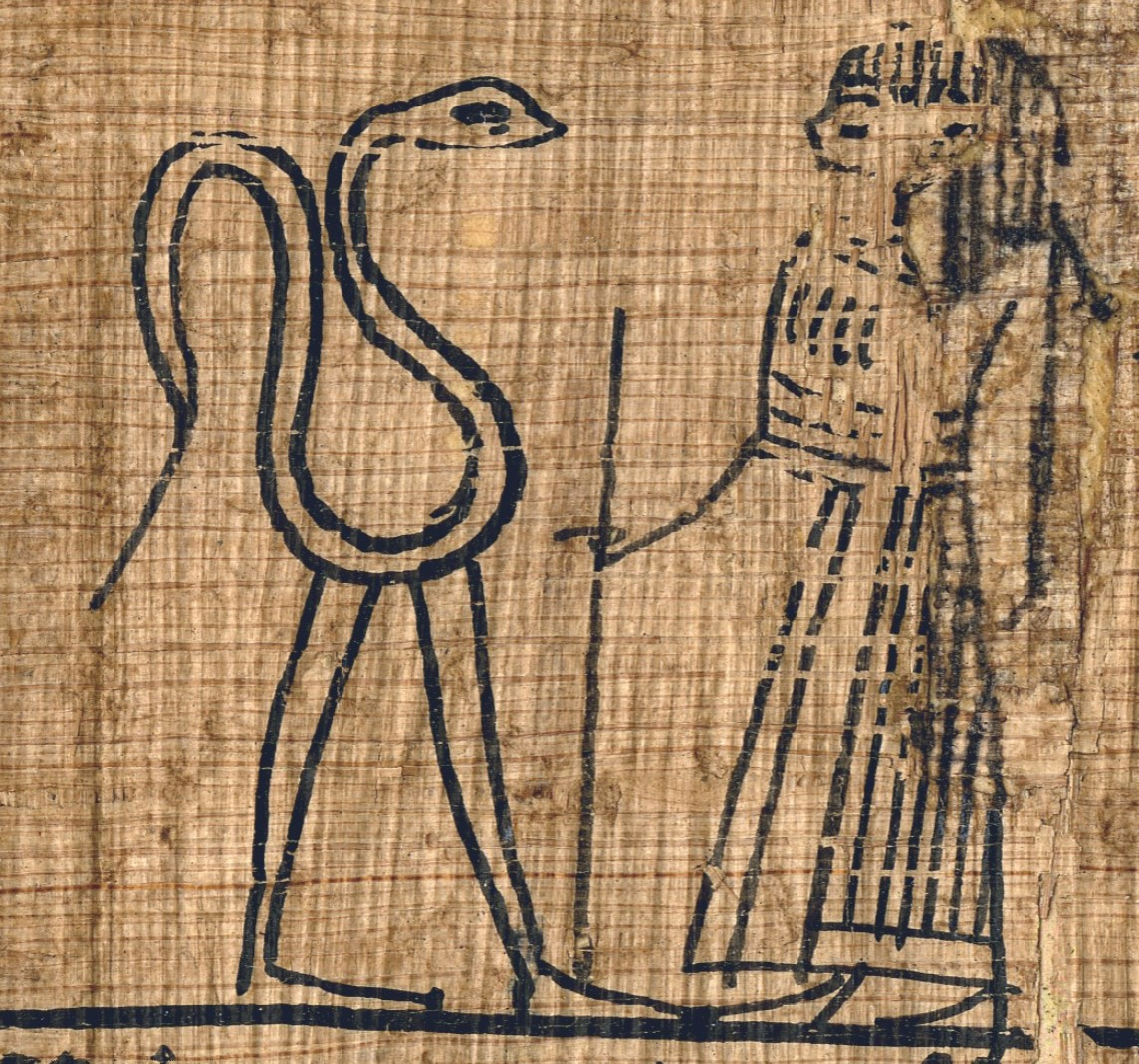
Vignette described in 1835 by Oliver Cowdery as coming from the Book of Joseph, allegedly depicting Eve's temptation by the serpent

The Book of Joseph is an untranslated text identified by Joseph Smith after analyzing Egyptian papyri that came into his possession in 1835. Joseph Smith taught that the text contains the writings of the ancient biblical patriarch Joseph. From the same papyri collection, Smith produced the first part of the Book of Abraham, but was killed before any known part of the Book of Joseph was translated.

The scroll associated with the Book of Joseph has been found by Egyptologists to be a Book of the Dead, a common funerary document, and is unrelated to the biblical patriarch Joseph.

== Background ==
Eleven mummies and several papyri were discovered near the ancient Egyptian city of Thebes by Antonio Lebolo between 1818 and 1822. Following Lebolo's death in 1830, the mummies and assorted objects were sent to New York with instructions that they should be sold in order to benefit the heirs of Lebolo. Michael H. Chandler served as an agent for an investment group in Philadelphia, touring with the mummies and artifacts. Over the next two years Chandler toured the eastern United States, displaying and selling some of the mummies as he traveled.

On June 30, 1835, Chandler exhibited his collection in Kirtland, Ohio. A promotional flyer created by Chandler states that the mummies "may have lived in the days of Jacob, Moses, or David". At the time, Kirtland was the home of the Latter Day Saints, led by Joseph Smith. Smith – who said he had translated the Book of Mormon from golden plates that had been inscribed with "reformed Egyptian" text – took an immediate interest in the papyri and soon offered Chandler a preliminary translation of the scrolls. Smith took an immediate interest in the papyri and purchased four mummies and at least five papyrus documents. According to Smith, the scrolls contained the writings of Abraham and Joseph, as well as the history of an Egyptian princess named "Katumin".

Oliver Cowdery wrote,

"...in connection with two of the bodies, were something rolled up with the same kind of linnen, saturated with the same bitumen, which, when examined, proved to be two rolls of papyrus, previously mentioned. I may add that two or three other small pieces of papyrus, with astronomical calculations, epitaphs, etc were found with others of the Mummies."

According to Cowdery, these two scrolls contained "...the writings of Abraham and Joseph". John Whitmer wrote in his history about the papyri:

"Joseph the Seer saw these records and by the revelation of Jesus Christ could translate these records which gave an account of our forefathers, much of which was written by Joseph of Egypt who was sold by his brethren, which when all translated will be a pleasing history and of great value to the Saints."

The September 1843 the entry in the History of the Church has the following:

[W]ith W. W. Phelps and Oliver Cowdery as scribes, I [Joseph Smith] commenced the translation of some of the characters or hieroglyphics, and much to our joy found that one of the [scrolls] contained the writings of Abraham, another the writings of Joseph of Egypt, etc. – a more full account of which will appear in its place, as I proceed to examine or unfold them.

== Book of Joseph Scroll ==
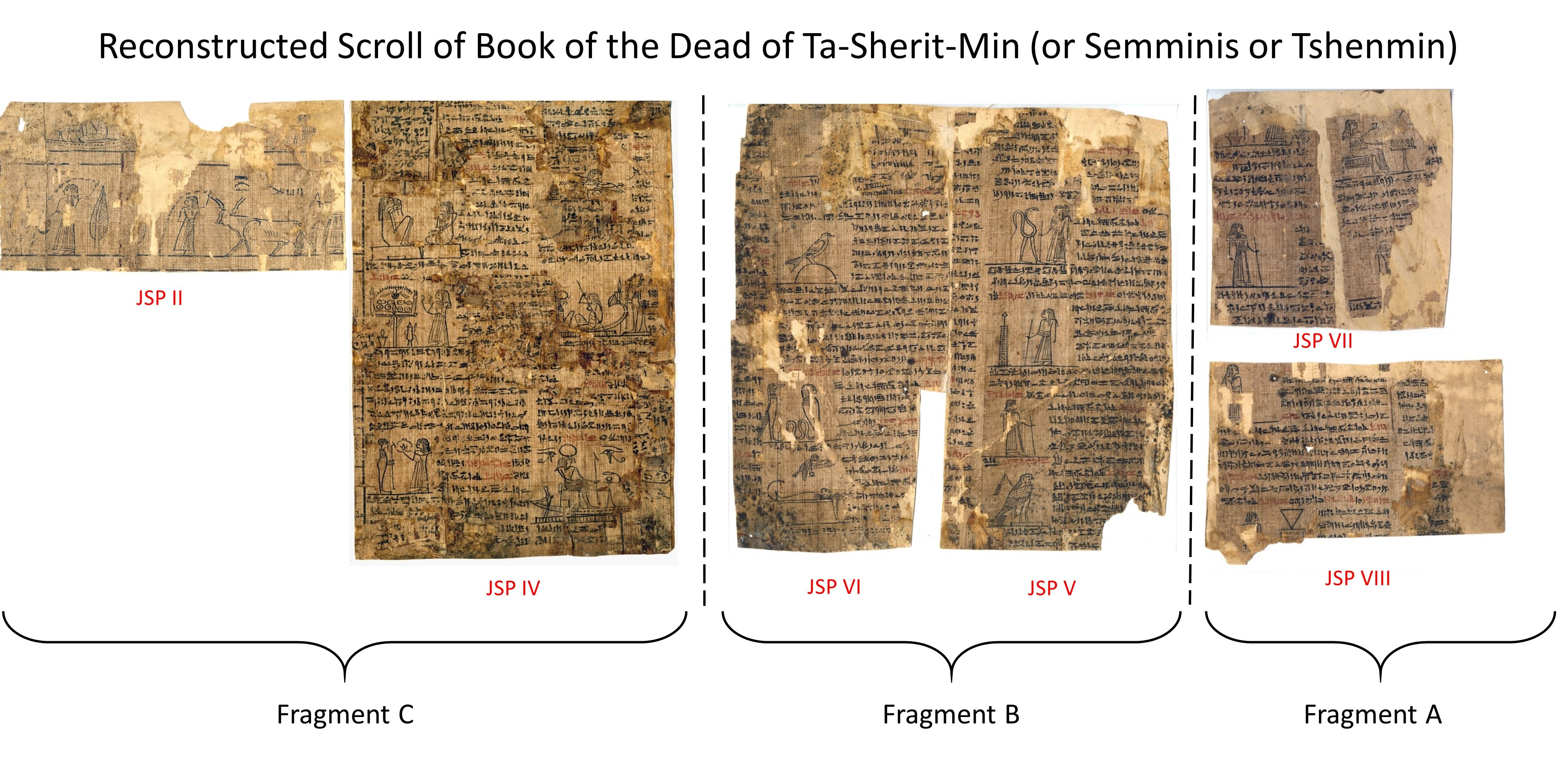

There were two scrolls that came into Joseph Smith's possession in 1835. The scroll that is most commonly identified as the Book of Joseph belonged to an Egyptian woman named Ta-sherit-Min(also Tshemmin, Semminis)

Joseph Smith Papyri II, V–IX, and most of IV have been identified by Egyptologists as "The Book of the Dead belonging to the lady Ta-sherit-Min (also Tshemmin, Semminis). Books of the Dead were used from around 1550 BCE to around 50 BCE. Ancient Egyptians believed that the Book of the Dead assisted the deceased in navigating the afterlife. Prospective deceased would pick and choose which spells (sometimes referred to as chapters) they wanted in their book to assist them in the afterlife. As such, there is a wide variance between different versions across its long history of use. While modern scholars have cataloged the spells, and given them numbers, these numbers are modern research conveniences and would have no meaning to ancient Egyptians.

The spell arrangement and textual variants are very similar to that of other early Ptolemaic era papyrus, including the Ryerson Papyrus. The surviving portion of the Book of the Dead for Ta-sherit-Min includes all or portions of spells 1-7, 10–14, 16, 53-54, 57, 59(?), 63, 65, 67, 70, 72, 74–77, 83, 86-89, 91, 100-101, 103–106, 110 and 125. Portions of the text are only known because characters were copied down.

=== Relationship with Book of the Dead for Nefer-ir-nebu ===
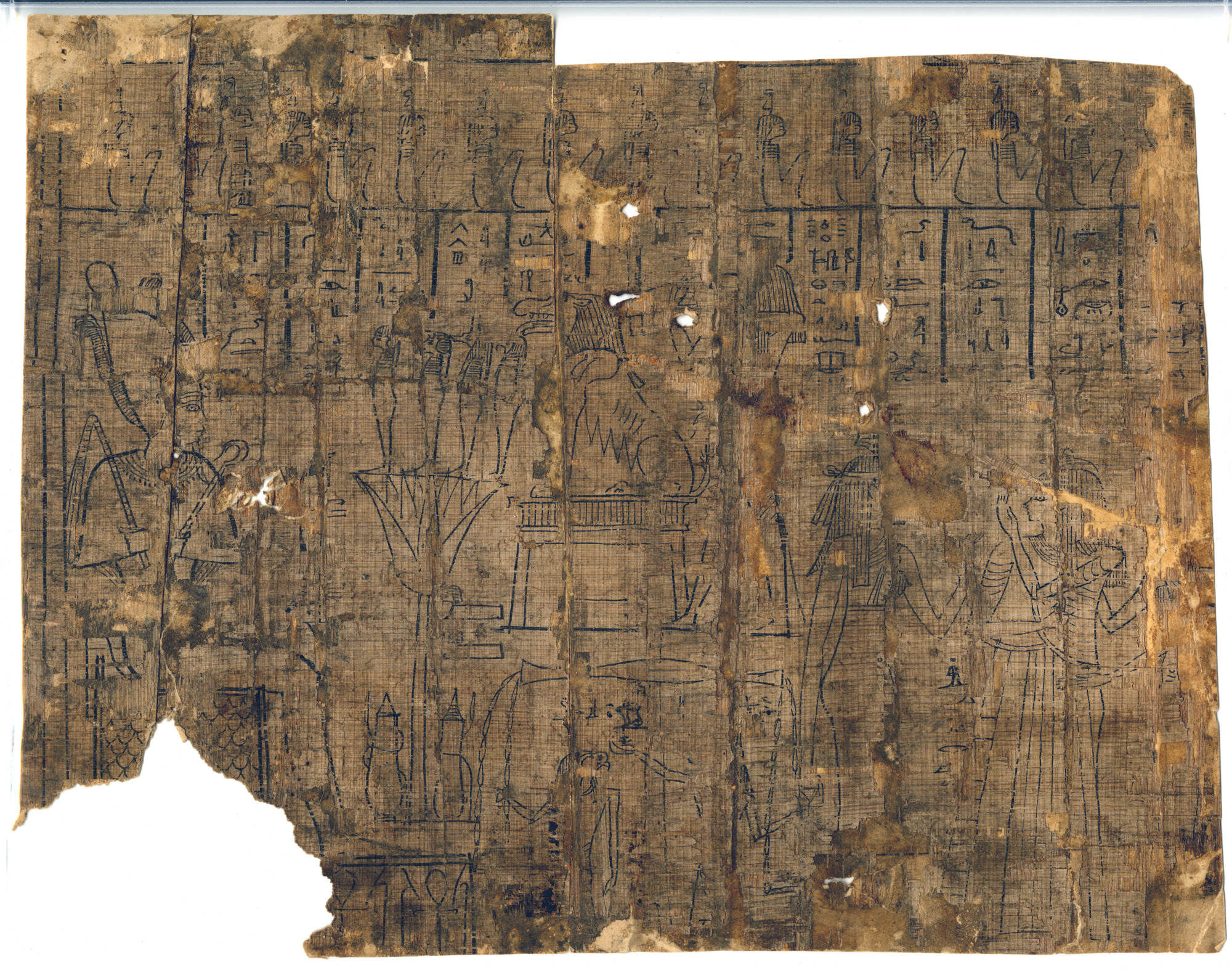
Vignette from Book of the Dead for Nefer-ir-nebu

Also part of the Joseph Smith Papyri collection is a fragment of a Book of the Dead scroll for a woman named Nefer-ir-nebu. The fragment contains a vignette that matches the description given by Oliver Cowdery of a final judgement scene he said came from the Book of Joseph.

The inner end of the same roll, (Joseph's record,) presents a representation of the judgement: At one view you behold the Savior seated upon his throne, crowned, and holding the sceptres of righteousness and power, before whom also, are assembled the twelve tribes of Israel, the nations, languages and tongues of the earth, the kingdoms of the world over which satan is represented as reigning. Michael the archangel, holding the key of the bottomless pit, and at the same time the devil as being chained and shut up in the bottomless pit."

As this came from a different scroll than the TaSheritMin scroll, various explanations have been posited:

- Oliver Cowdery believed the Nefer-ir-nebu vignette was part of the TaSheritMin scroll. Cowdery did not know Egyptian, and would not have been able to read the owners names' on the scrolls, so it is not unreasonable to think he could have conflated the two scrolls.
- There was a similar vignette in the TaSheritMin scroll that is no longer extant. A judgement scene vignette is very common to Books of the Dead, and it is not unlikely that one was included in the TaSheritMin scroll.

== Content ==
Although the text was untranslated, the content of the Book of Joseph was hinted at by Joseph Smith. In an 1842 sermon, Smith taught:

"the learning of the Egyptians, and their knowledge of astronomy was no doubt taught them by Abraham and Joseph, as their records testify, who received it from the Lord."

Other eye-witnesses left clues as to what was on the papyrus scrolls. William W. Phelps, Joseph Smith's scribe, wrote that the Book of Joseph was written in Pharaoh's court. In a July 1835 letter to his wife he noted:

"Last evening we received your first letter after an absence of twelve weeks and twelve hours.... Brother Joseph [Smith] remarked that it was as easy to shed tears while reading that letter as it was when reading the History of Joseph in Egypt. ... The last of June four Egyptian mummies were brought here; there were two papyrus rolls, besides some other ancient Egyptian writings with them. As no one could translate these writings, they were presented to President Smith. He soon knew what they were and said they, the 'rolls of papyrus,' contained the sacred record kept of Joseph in Pharaoh's Court in Egypt, and the teachings of Father Abraham."

While the mention of shedding tears while reading the History of Joseph in Egypt could indicate that Joseph Smith had translated a portion of the Book of Joseph, the "History of Joseph in Egypt" could also simply refer to the story as written in the Book of Genesis in the Bible.

There seemed to be a greater emphasis on the Book of Joseph scroll in the Kirtland era than later on, as the majority of the references come from that time period, several of them not even mentioning the Book of Abraham. Albert Brown, a convert to the church, wrote to his parents on November 1, 1835, indicating that there were prophecies of the patriarch Jacob on the Joseph scroll:

"I will relate one incident that happened not long since in our favour by some men that had four egyptian mummis which th[e]y were carr[y]ing through the world to exibiat and also an ancient record that was found in their coffins this record containing som of the history of josef while in egypt and also of jacob and many prophesies delivered by them."

Oliver Cowdery described the interpretation of various vignettes accompanying "Joseph's record" as follows:

"The representation of the god-head--three, yet in one, is curiously drawn to give simply, though impressively, the writers views of that exalted personage. The serpent, represented as walking, or formed in a manner to be able to walk, standing in front of, and near a female figure, is to me, one of the greatest representations I have ever seen upon paper, or a writing substance; ... Enoch's Pillar, as mentioned by Josephus, is upon the same roll. ... I might continue my communication to a great length upon the different figures and characters represented upon the two rolls, but I have no doubt my subject has already become sufficiently prolix for your patience:"

Vignettes from TaSheritMin scroll matching Oliver Cowdery's description

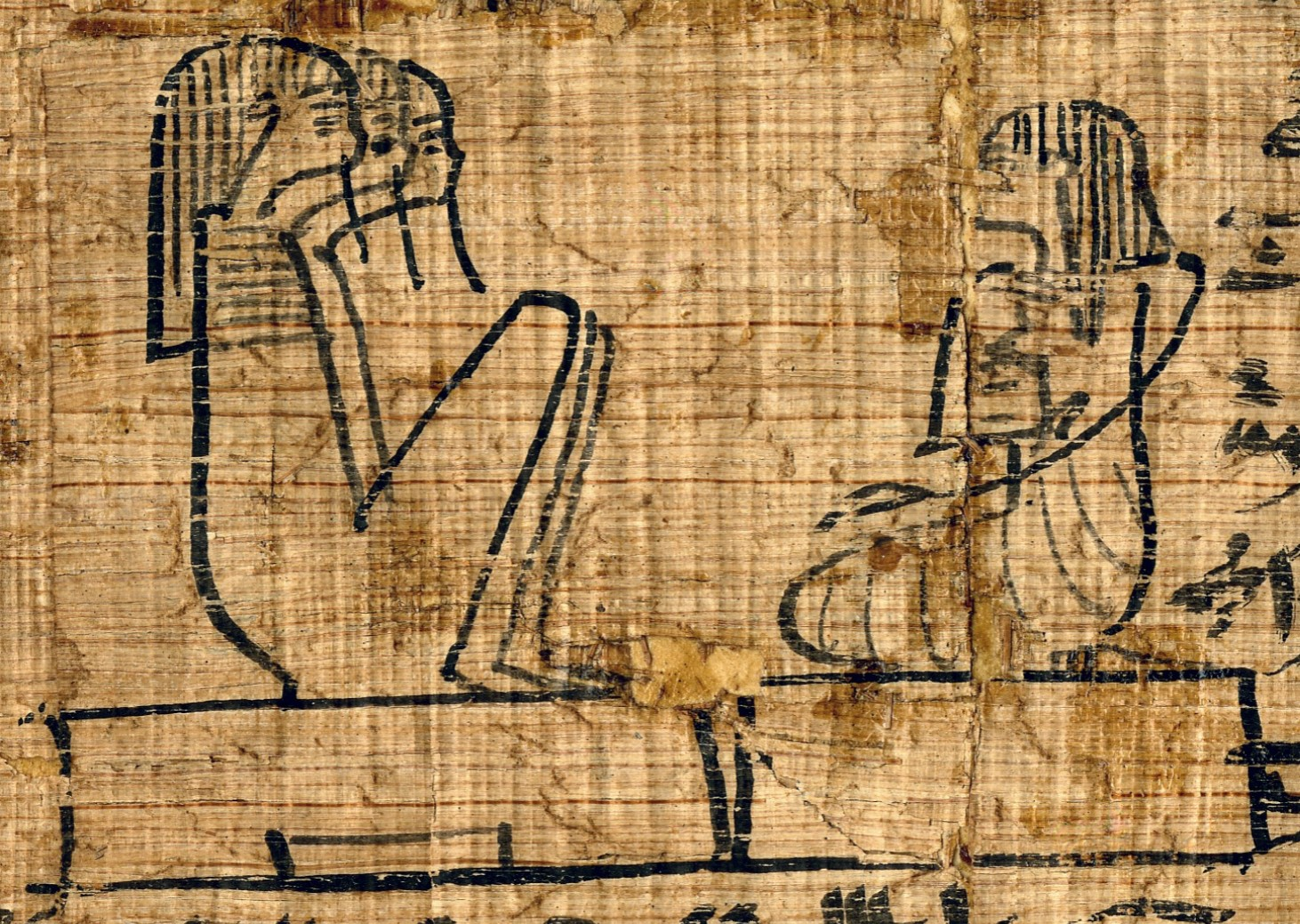
The deceased sitting on a mat before three Gods, which Cowdery described as "The representation of the god-head."

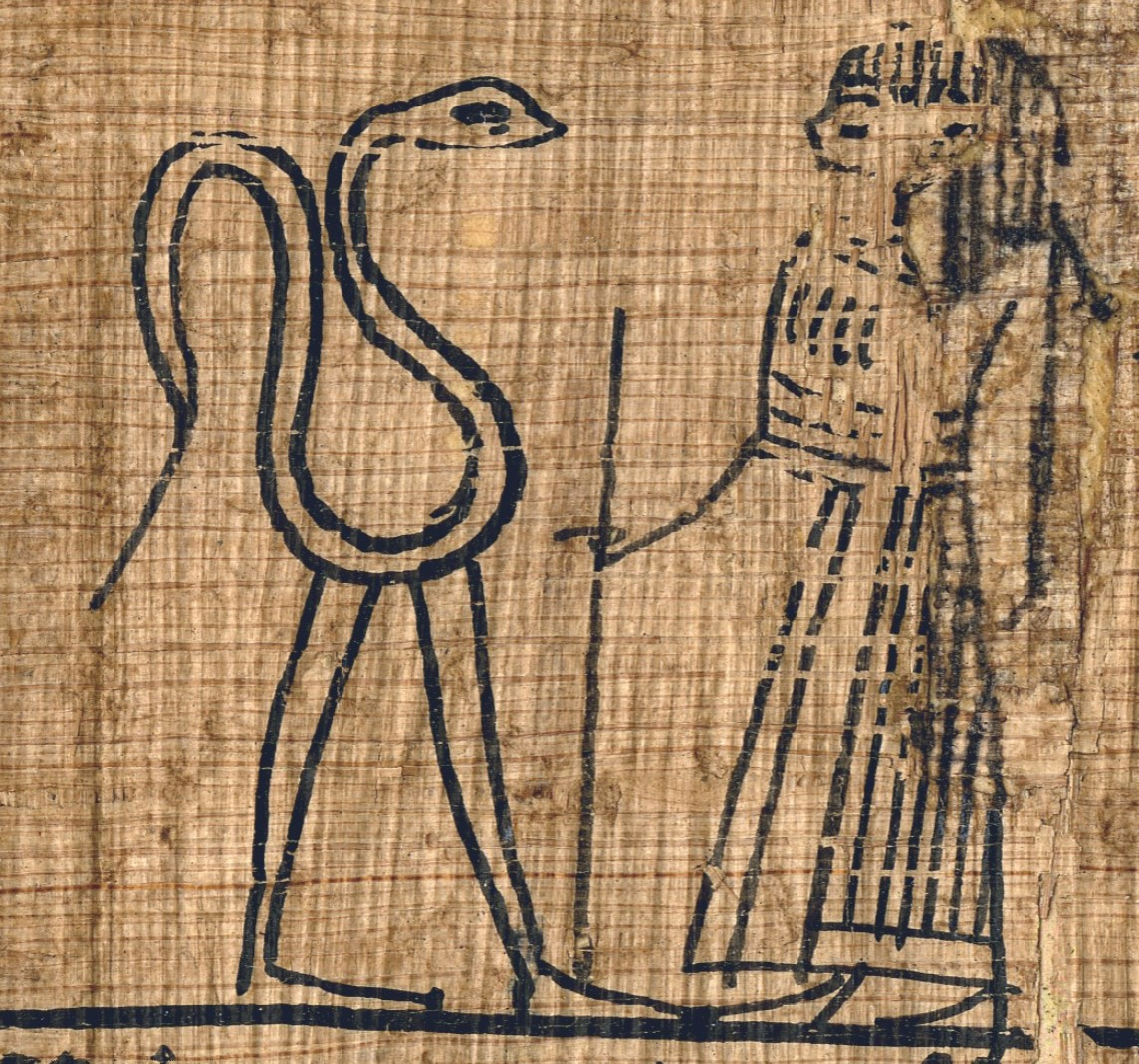
The deceased standing before a walking serpent. Cowdery said that this was the Serpent of Eden.

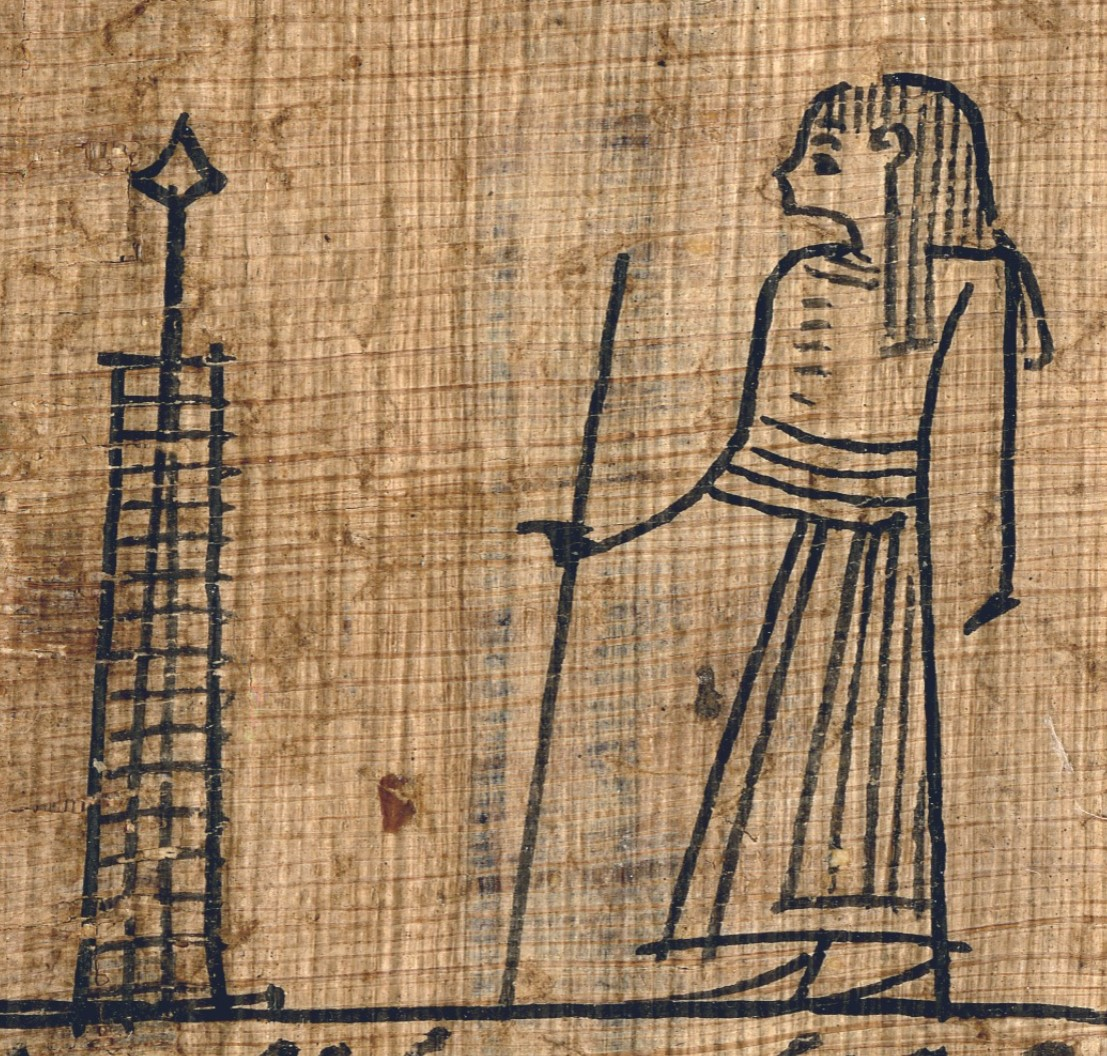
The deceased striding in front of a pillar which represents the city Heliopolis. Cowdery associated it with "Enoch's Pillar."

When the papyri were re-discovered in the 1960s, LDS Church General Authority Milton R. Hunter told N. Eldon Tanner, second counselor in the LDS Church First Presidency, about Cowdery's connection of the vignettes to the Book of Joseph. Tanner responded that he "didn't want that suggestion made and that information to get out, so I wouldn't say that (if I were you) to anybody, but just for your own curiosity look at it."

Oliver was a scribe to Joseph, with several translation related documents in his handwriting, and would have been intimately familiar with Joseph Smith's thoughts on the interpretation of these vignettes. As LDS Scholar Quinten Barney states, "There is no grounds for assuming that Oliver’s interpretations of the vignettes need be products of his own mind. To the contrary, Oliver’s proximity to both the Prophet and the papyri strongly suggest that his interpretations of the vignettes were based on Joseph Smith’s interpretations."

William West visited Kirtland and wrote his experiences down in a pamphlet. Of the mummies and papyri he wrote:

The Mormons have four mummies and a quantity of records, written on papyrus, in Egyptian Hierogliphics, which were brought from the catacombs near Thebes, in Egypt. They say the mummies were Egyptian, but the records are those of Abraham and Joseph, and contain important information respecting the creation, the fall of man, the deluge, the patriarchs, the book of Mormon, the lost tribe, the gathering, the end of the world, the judgment, &c. &c. This is as near as I can recollect it; if there is an error I hope some of the Mormons will point it out, and I will recall it.

The translation of the Book of Abraham that Smith produced was not considered complete by him, so it cannot be assumed that the topics mentioned by William West not covered in the Book of Abraham are by default in the Book of Joseph.

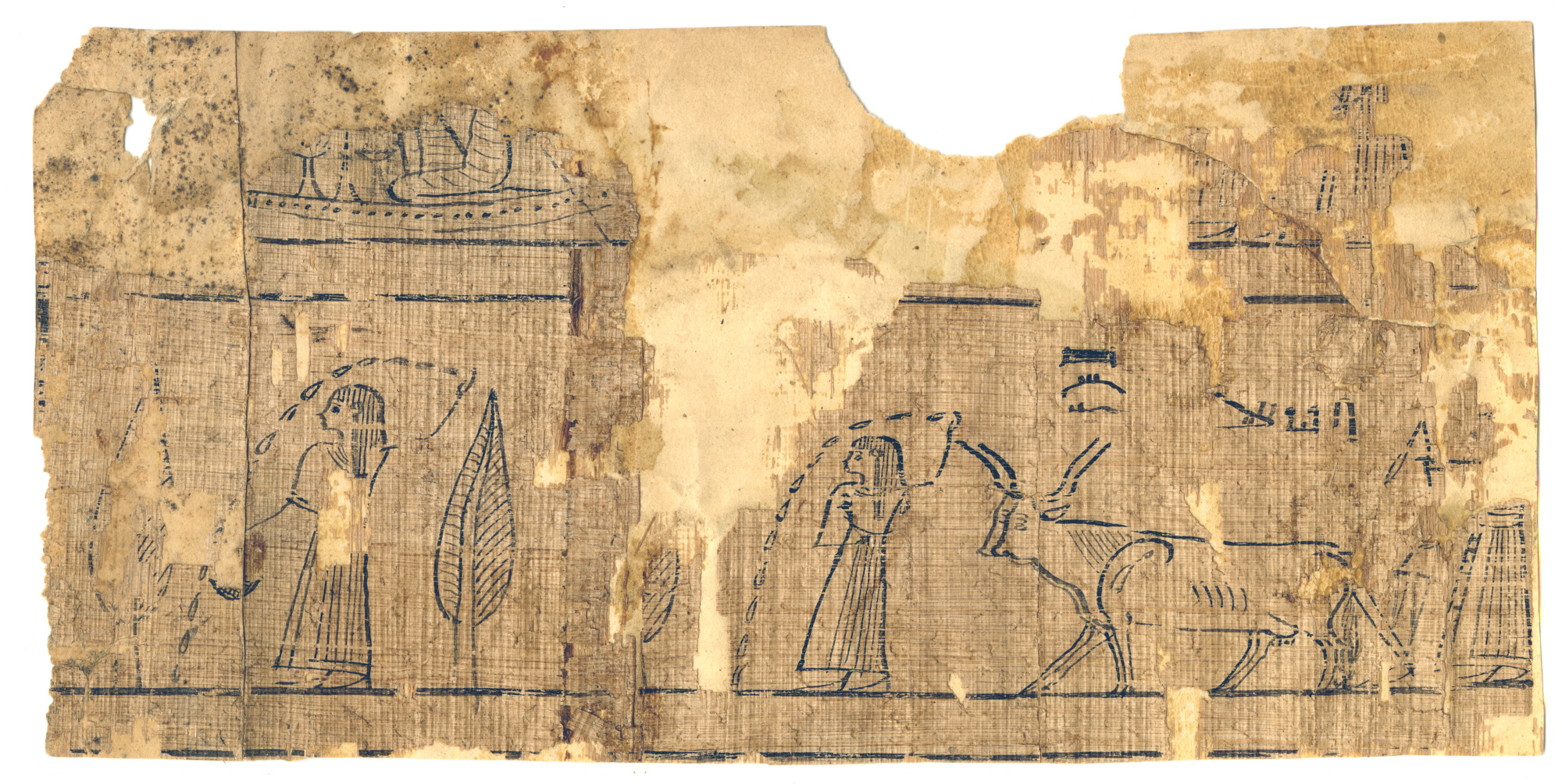
Vignette matching William Appleby's description

William Appleby saw the papyri in 1841, and in 1848 wrote a recollection of his experience. He seemed to believe that the papyri were written in the handwriting of the patriarch Joseph.

"I paid Br. Joseph a visit ... Saw the Rolls of Papyrus and the writings thereon, taken from off the bosom of the Male Mummy, having some of the writings of ancient Abraham and of Joseph that was sold into Egypt. ... The writings are beautiful and plain, composed of red, and black inks. There is a perceptible difference, between the writings. Joseph [of Egypt], appears to have been the best scribe. There are also representations of men, beasts, Birds, Idols and oxen attached to a kind of plough, and a female guiding it. Also the serpent when he beguiled Eve. He appears with two legs, erect in the form and appearance of man. But his head in the form, and representing the Serpent, with his forked tongue extended."

The Book of Mormon alludes to writings of Joseph:

"And now, I, Nephi, speak concerning the prophecies of which my father hath spoken, concerning Joseph, who was carried into Egypt. For behold, he truly prophesied concerning all his seed. And the prophecies which he wrote, there are not many greater. And he prophesied concerning us, and our future generations; and they are written upon the plates of brass."

Latter Day Saint theology has not connected the relationship between the Book of Joseph and the text alluded to in the Book of Mormon.

=== Relationship with the temple ceremony ===
Some have speculated that the temple endowment ceremony may have come in part from the Book of Joseph. Brigham Young University professor H. Donl Peterson wrote, "Oliver Cowdery's explanation of the contents of the book of Joseph, seem to have relevance with regard to the temple ceremony. ... The writings of Abraham and Joseph were purchased by the Church in July 1835 and the partial endowment was introduced to the brethren by the Prophet Joseph Smith in January 1836. Is this merely coincidental?"

Bruce R. McConkie wrote in reference to the temple ceremony, "They were given in modern times to the prophet Joseph Smith by revelation, many things connected with them being translated by the Prophet from the papyrus on which the book of Abraham was recorded."

=== Length of the text ===
It is unknown how long the text would be, but Oliver Cowdery gave an indication in 1835 that it could be quite large:

"When the translation of these valuable documents will be completed, I am unable to say; neither can I gave you a probable idea how large volumes they will make; but judging from their size, and the comprehensiveness of the language, one might reasonably expect to see sufficient to develop much on the mighty of the ancient men of God."

William West, a visitor to Kirtland saw the mummies, and noted, "They say that the mummies were Epyptian, but the records are those of Abraham and Joseph...and a larger volume than the Bible will be required to contain them."

== See also ==
- Book of Abraham Scroll

== Notes ==
=== Sources ===
- Rhodes, Michael D. (2002). The Hôr Book of breathings : a translation and commentary. Provo, Utah: Foundation for Ancient Research and Mormon Studies, Brigham Young University. ISBN 978-0-934893-63-3.
- Ritner, Robert Kriech (2013). The Joseph Smith Egyptian papyri : a complete edition : P. JS 1-4 and the hypocephalus of Sheshonq. Salt Lake City: Signature Books.
- Smith, Joseph (1902), History of the Church, vol. 2, archived from the original on February 21, 2017
