= Secret Ceremonies =

1993 book by Deborah Laake

- Author: Deborah Laake
- Language: English
- Subject: memoirs, autobiography
- Publisher: William Morrow & Co (1st edition); Island Books (2nd edition)
- Publication date: April 1993
- Publication place: United States
- Media type: Print (Hardcover, Paperback)
- Pages: 384 pp (2nd edition)
- ISBN: 0-688-09304-3
- OCLC: 27011618
- Dewey Decimal: 289.3/092 B 20
- LC Class: BX8645 .L22 1993

Secret Ceremonies: A Mormon Woman's Intimate Diary of Marriage and Beyond is a 1993 autobiographical book written by American journalist and columnist Deborah Laake.

== Description ==
Laake, a former member of the Church of Jesus Christ of Latter-day Saints (LDS Church), chronicles her experiences in Mormonism, and the various rituals performed in the church's temples. Laake recounts her studies at Brigham Young University, her loveless first marriage at nineteen, her subsequent divorce, and the problems she encountered with LDS Church authorities and her relatives due to her practice of masturbation. The book was particularly noted for its revelation of details from temple rituals like the endowment and celestial marriage. In the book, Laake states that the pressures and sexual repression exerted by the church caused her to be ostracized and eventually hospitalized in a mental institution.

In 1994, a second edition of the book was published with additional information.

== Critical reception ==
Secret Ceremonies was generally well received by critics. Kirkus Reviews called it, "A candid, often startling memoir of the author's life as a Mormon wife .... By no means objective, then, but, still, an affectingly personal look into the well-guarded citadel of Mormondom."

In terms of sales, the book was a commercial success, it spent fifteen weeks on the New York Times best-seller list. As of May 1994, over 500,000 copies were printed and the book was published in England, Germany and Bulgaria.

Shortly after the book's publication, Laake was excommunicated by the LDS Church for apostasy. Laake also stated that she was called a "liar" and received opposition from Mormon authorities.
