= Teachings of Presidents of the Church =

The ninth book in the series, featuring the teachings of church founder Joseph Smith.

Teachings of Presidents of the Church is a series of books published by the Church of Jesus Christ of Latter-day Saints (LDS Church). Each book of the series compiles the teachings and sermons of one of the men who has served as president of the LDS Church. The text of each book is not limited to sermons preached while the person was president of the church, but generally contain teachings given during their time as an apostle.

The series began in 1997, with the release of the Brigham Young edition. The books were not issued in the same order in which presidents served. They also are not intended to be a comprehensive collection of the words, sermons, or writings of their subjects. Church members have been encouraged to save the books and make a collection in their homes. Four and a half million copies of the 2008 adult study course, Teachings of Presidents of the Church: Joseph Smith, were printed.

Initially, the books were the basis for many of the lessons presented in weekly Relief Society and priesthood meetings. Each collection was used as the class curriculum for one or two calendar years, depending on the length of the book. In 2010 and 2011, the church temporarily ceased using the series for communal study at Sunday meetings and instead used a newly revised Gospel Principles manual. Sunday study of the Teachings of Presidents of the Church series resumed in 2012 but concluded at the end of 2017.

Beginning in 2018, adult church members used a new approach to the Sunday curriculum entitled Come Follow Me: For Melchizedek Priesthood and Relief Society. This placed greater emphasis on members counseling together regarding local needs, increased study of general conference talks, and studying other topics selected by general church leadership.)

The copyright in the books is held by Intellectual Reserve, but they are available in electronic format for free on the LDS Church's website.

== Books in the series ==
No.	Publication date	President of the Church & years in tenure	Years used as curriculum
1	1997	Brigham Young (1847–1877)	1998–1999
2	1998	Joseph F. Smith (1901–1918)	2000–2001
3	2000	Harold B. Lee (1972–1973)	2002
4	2001	John Taylor (1880–1887)	2003
5	2002	Heber J. Grant (1918–1945)	2004
6	2003	David O. McKay (1951–1970)	2005
7	2004	Wilford Woodruff (1889–1898)	2006
8	2006	Spencer W. Kimball (1973–1985)	2007
9	2007	Joseph Smith (1830–1844)	2008–2009
10	2011	George Albert Smith (1945–1951)	2012
11	2012	Lorenzo Snow (1898–1901)	2013
12	2013	Joseph Fielding Smith (1970–1972)	2014
13	2014	Ezra Taft Benson (1985–1994)	2015
14	2015	Howard W. Hunter (1994–1995)	2016
15	2016	Gordon B. Hinckley (1995–2008)	2017
16	2022	Thomas S. Monson (2008–2018)	N/A
17	2024–2025 (partly)	Russell M. Nelson (2018–2025)	N/A

Note: Initial sections for Russell M. Nelson, the seventeenth church president, were initially published on the church's website in 2024, with more provided in 2025. This includes eight chapters released a few days following his death. To date, Nelson is the only church president to have his teachings published as part of this series during his lifetime.
