= Richard Abanes =

American writer and actor

Richard Abanes (/əˈbɑːnɪs/; born October 13, 1961) is an American playwright, composer, lyricist, author, singer, and actor.

== Early career ==
Abanes began his first career as a professional singer, dancer, and actor (with Screen Actors Guild and Actors' Equity Association) in local theater (Rockford, Illinois) at the age of thirteen. He began doing semi-professional theater within a year, and during his high school years he was featured in many productions throughout Northern Illinois including West Side Story, Fiddler on the Roof, and You're a Good Man, Charlie Brown. He also became a featured dancer in the Rockford Dance Company, while simultaneously studying dance in Chicago with professional companies such as The Hubbard Street Dancers and Joel Hall Studios.

Abanes subsequently moved to New York, where he landed a role in the "International" and "Bus & Truck" companies of the hit Broadway musical A Chorus Line. Soon afterwards, Abanes was given a featured dance role on Broadway in the musical Dreamgirls. In the years that followed, Abanes was featured in national television commercials such as Canada Dry, Wendy's, and Nissan. He also played the lead role in an ABC Afterschool Special, co-starred in the film Rappin', and starred in the Bill Moyers PBS special titled "The Constitution." While in New York, he continued his studies in dance with American Dance Machine, Alvin Ailey Dance Center, American Ballet Theatre, Luigi's Jazz Center, Rick Atwell, and Ann Reinking.

== Journalist and author ==
Abanes eventually began to pursue a second career as a full-time freelance journalist. This led to his first book, Prophets of the Apocalypse: David Koresh and Other American Messiahs, which was co-authored with three other writers and published in 1994 (Baker Books). He would go on to write 19 more books, the last of which was published in 2009. As an author and journalist, Abanes specialized in socio-religious issues, cults, the occult, world religions, the entertainment industry, and pop culture.

In 1997, Abanes won the Evangelical Press Association's Higher Goals In Journalism Award for an article on the various religions in America.

Abanes 1996 book, American Militias: Rebellion, Racism & Religion was lauded as a "balanced and forthright study offer[ing] invaluable insight" by Publishers Weekly.

Also in 1997, he received an award from The Gustavus Myers Center for the Study of Bigotry and Human Rights.

As a lecturer on diverse social, religious, and historical topics, he has been a guest speaker at various institutions, including the Simon Wiesenthal Center, Caltech, Mensa, California Baptist University, and Biola University. Abanes also has been interviewed on various radio and TV programs and networks including the BBC, MSNBC, CNN, Extra, and Hard Copy as an authority on cults, religion, pop culture, and the entertainment industry.

In 1998, while continuing his writing pursuits, Abanes joined the staff of Rick Warren's Saddleback Church as its Creative Arts Director and assistant music minister. While serving at Saddleback, Abanes: taught Bible studies; write/directed productions involving the Drama Ministry and dance ministry; gave acting classes; and led worship services. He also produced two CD albums of original contemporary Christian music ("Hold On" and "Everlasting Love") that together sold nearly 100,000 copies. (A third CD titled "There Is A God," a combination of tracks from his first two albums, is now distributed through Watchfire Music). He eventually left Saddleback in 2000 in order to devote more time to writing (see Marc Gunther, "Will Success Spoil Rick Warren?," CNN, October 31, 2005)

In 2001, Abanes's book Harry Potter and the Bible: The Menance Behind the Magick was cited by the Associated Press as an example of "Christian critics who claim the boy wizard is a tool leading children to witchcraft and sin." Abanes undertook an eight-city book tour ahead of the release of the film Harry Potter and the Sorcerer's Stone in the United States. He argued that the book "has real world occult parallels" and that "Kids are enthralled by with it. And kids like to copy."

== Return to the stage ==
In 2010, Abanes ceased his activities as an author/journalist to again work in the field of show business as a singer, dancer, and actor. In July of that year, he performed the role of Judas in Jesus Christ Superstar with Rockford's Bonzi Productions. Abanes has since appeared on New York stages in a production "Song of Solomon" (written by Andrew Beall & Neil Van Leeuwen), "Yes! The Musical" (originally produced in showcase form by The Duke Ellington Center for the Arts), and "Pearl: The Musical" (based on the life of Pearl Bailey). In this latter show (directed by Tony Award winner, Ben Harney), Abanes played multiple roles including entertainment legends Bob Hope, Johnny Mercer, Frank Sinatra, and Andy Williams. He was most recently seen in 2022 in the Off-Broadway producer's staged reading of the new musical, "Goodbye New York," by Andrew Beall, Evan McCormick, and David Don Miller (see "Goodbye, New York" from Broadway World).

As of 2023, Abanes was still working in the entertainment industry not only as a performer, but also as a playwright, composer, and lyricist. His first play, "The Art of Life," is currently in the process of being produced as a full production. A staged public reading of the play took place on April 5, 2024, in New York. Its cast included several Broadway performers, as well as Gracie McGraw, the daughter of Tim McGraw and Faith Hill. Richie's first musical, "Carly," is in the process of being written.

== Bibliography ==
- Religions of the Stars (ISBN 978-0-7642-0648-1)
- A New Earth, An Old Deception (ISBN 978-0-7642-0664-1)
- He Is Risen: Reflections On Easter & the Forty Days of Lent (ISBN 978-0-446-69679-1)
- Homeland Insecurity: A Novel (ISBN 0-7369-1469-2)
- What Every Parent Needs to Know About Video Games (ISBN 0-7369-1740-3)
- Rick Warren and the Purpose that Drives Him (ISBN 0-7369-1738-1)
- Harry Potter, Narnia, and The Lord of the Rings (ISBN 0-7369-1700-4)
- The Truth Behind the Da Vinci Code (ISBN 0-7369-1439-0)
- Becoming Gods: A Closer Look at 21st Century Mormonism (ISBN 0-7369-1355-6); re-titled and re-covered as Inside Today's Mormonism (ISBN 0-7369-1968-6)
- One Nation Under Gods: A History of the Mormon Church (2002)(ISBN 1-56858-219-6); paperback edition (2003) (ISBN 1-56858-283-8)
- Fantasy and Your Family (ISBN 0-87509-975-0); revised, updated, and expanded into Harry Potter, Narnia, and The Lord of the Rings (see above).
- Harry Potter and the Bible (ISBN 0-88965-201-5)
- Defending the Faith: A Beginner's Guide to Cults and New Religions (ISBN 0-8010-5782-5)
- Cults, New Religious Movements, and Your Family (ISBN 0-89107-981-5)
- End-Time Visions: The Road to Armageddon? (ISBN 0-8054-1769-9); paperback edition titled End-Time Visions: The Doomsday Obsession (ISBN 0-8054-1965-9)
- American Militias: Rebellion, Racism & Religion (ISBN 0-8308-1368-3)
- Journey into the Light (ISBN 0-8010-5480-X)
- The Less Traveled Road and the Bible (ISBN 0-88965-117-5)
- Embraced by the Light and the Bible (ISBN 0-88965-111-6)
- Prophets of the Apocalypse: David Koresh and Other American Messiahs (ISBN 0-8010-8367-2)
