= Richard and Joan Ostling =

American journalists

Richard Ostling is an American author and journalist living in Ridgewood, New Jersey. He and his wife, the late Joan K. Ostling, are the co-authors of Mormon America: The Power and the Promise (1999; revised ed. 2007).

== Richard Ostling ==
Richard N. Ostling (born July 14, 1940, in Endicott, New York) is a journalist who reports on religious topics. He was a senior correspondent for Time and president of the Religion Newswriters Association. Once a senior editor of The Michigan Daily, he graduated Phi Beta Kappa from the University of Michigan and holds master's degrees in journalism (Northwestern University) and religion (George Washington University) along with an honorary Doctor of Letters degree from Gordon College. He is listed in Who's Who in America. He has conducted religious interviews on at least four continents.

Richard Ostling previously reported for the Morning News and Evening Journal and Christianity Today as well as once being the chief religion writer for the Associated Press, where he spent eight years.

In over 27 years at Time, he has written a number of cover stories. He has broadcast on CBS Radio. He has reported regularly for The NewsHour with Jim Lehrer. Over the course of his career, he has interviewed several notable religious figures such as Billy Graham, the Dalai Lama, the late Mother Teresa and Cardinal Joseph Ratzinger (later Pope Benedict XVI). He authored many of the Time magazine stories on the rise of fundamentalist Christianity, including cover stories on Jerry Falwell, Pat Robertson, Jim Bakker and Jimmy Swaggart. Ostling was the co-author, with Bernard Nathanson, of Aborting America: A History of the Abortion Rights Movement in the United States.

Richard Ostling and his wife had two children, Margaret and Elizabeth.

The Center for Religious Inquiry has called Richard Ostling "one of the most distinguished and honored writers on religion in America." A review in The New York Times called Mormon America: The Power and the Promise "eminently fair, well researched and exhaustive." "His distinctions include a Pulitzer Prize nomination; the American Academy of Religion, Supple and Templeton prizes; and the Lifetime Achievement Award of the Religion Newswriters Association."

== Joan Ostling ==
Joan K. Ostling (June 29, 1939 – January 11, 2009) was an assistant professor of English and journalism at Nyack College, as well as having taught at several other evangelical colleges. She also co-authored a comprehensive bibliography of books by and about C. S. Lewis. Joan Ostling earned master's degrees in English and political science and was a writer and editor for the US Information Agency in Washington, DC.

Joan Ostling died of breast cancer on January 11, 2009 at her home in Ridgewood, New Jersey.
