= Bibliography of the Latter Day Saint movement =

This is a bibliography of works on the Latter Day Saint movement.

== General ==
=== Overviews ===
- Hinckley, Gordon B. (1947). What of the Mormons?: A Brief Study of the Church of Jesus Christ of Latter-day Saints. The Church of Jesus Christ of Latter-day Saints. ISBN 1494053462.
  - As part of the celebration of the 100th anniversary of the Mormon pioneers' arrival in the Salt Lake Valley, LDS church president George Albert Smith tasked Hinckley (then employed as the Executive Secretary to the Church Radio, Publicity, and Mission Literature Committee) to write a book which would introduce the Church to non-members; it is divided into two sections— "The Mormons Today: A Contemporary Picture" and "The Mormons Yesterday: Their History"; beginning in 1969, the Church began publishing the historical part alone under the title Truth Restored: A Short History of The Church of Jesus Christ of Latter-day Saints.
- Ludlow, Daniel H., ed. (1992). Encyclopedia of Mormonism: The History, Scripture, Doctrine, and Procedure of the Church of Jesus Christ of Latter-day Saints. New York: Macmillan. ISBN 002904040X.
  - A semiofficial encyclopedia for topics relevant to the LDS Church. Published in four volumes, with an optional fifth volume containing the "Standard Works."
- Bushman, Richard Lyman (22 April 2008). Mormonism: A Very Short Introduction. Oxford University Press, USA. ISBN 978-0195310306.
  - A compact (144 pages) history of the LDS Church, and survey of contentious issues in contemporary Mormonism; an installment in the Very Short Introductions book series by an eminent historian and practicing Mormon.
- Shipps, Jan (1987). Mormonism: The Story of a New Religious Tradition. University of Illinois Press. ISBN 0252014170.
  - Scholarly analysis of the religion's origins and development; written by a cultural historian, who is a leading authority on Mormonism (yet not a member of the faith).
- Ostling, Richard; Ostling, Joan K. (2012) [2001]. Mormon America: The Power and the Promise (revised and updated ed.). HarperCollins. ISBN 978-0061432958.
  - By journalists who sought to write "a candid but non-polemical" overview of the Mormon world; investigates the LDS Church's finances.
- Mauss, Armand L. (1994). The Angel and the Beehive: The Mormon Struggle with Assimilation. University of Illinois Press. ISBN 0252020715.
  - A sociological analysis of the previous forty years of Mormon history and a cultural "retrenchment" among Mormons— against assimilation.
- Bushman, Claudia L. (30 January 2006). Contemporary Mormonism: Latter-day Saints in Modern America. Greenwood Publishing Group. ISBN 027598933X.
  - A collection of the viewpoints of contemporary Mormons in America, on their beliefs, rituals, and practices; also their views on race, ethnicity, social class, gender, and sexual orientation.
- O'Dea, Thomas F. (1957). The Mormons. The University of Chicago Press.
  - A study of the Mormons and their religion by a non-member sociologist; includes an account of LDS theology, with an analysis of the Book of Mormon.

=== History ===
- Allen, James B.; Leonard, Glen M. (1992) [1976]. The Story of the Latter-day Saints (2nd, revised and enlarged ed.). Salt Lake City, Utah: Deseret Book. ISBN 087579565X.
  - A single-volume history covering the LDS Church down to 1991. Commissioned by the Church Historical Department; it puts the history of the Church in the context of its times. First published on the one-hundredth anniversary of Joseph Fielding Smith's birth; it was subject to some controversy within the Church, with some considering it not "spiritual enough."
- Smith, Joseph (1858). Roberts, B. H. (ed.). History of the Church. Deseret Book Company. ISBN 0875794866. Originally entitled History of Joseph Smith; a revised edition was published in seven volumes under the title History of the Church of Jesus Christ of Latter-day Saints from 1902 to 1932; it is currently published under the shortened title.
  - A semi-official history of the early Latter Day Saint movement during the lifetime of Joseph Smith. It is largely composed of Smith's writings with interpolations and editorial comments by Smith's secretaries and scribes; and, after Smith's death, historians of the LDS Church.
- Smith, Joseph Fielding (1922). Essentials in Church History: A History of the Church From the Birth of Joseph Smith to the Present Time (1922), With Introductory Chapters on the Antiquity of the Gospel and the "Falling Away,". Salt Lake City, Utah: Deseret News Press. ISBN 1290646546.
  - Single volume history produced by the LDS Church; written by an Apostle.
- Smith, Joseph (31 March 2012). Davidson, Karen Lynn; Whittaker, David J.; Ashurst-McGee, Mark R.; Jensen, Richard L. (eds.). Histories, Volume 1: Joseph Smith Histories, 1832–1844. The Joseph Smith Papers: Histories Series (Book 1 of 2). Salt Lake City: The Church Historian's Press. ISBN 978-1606411964.
  - Collection of six personal and church histories written, dictated, or closely supervised by Smith; including accounts of his first vision of Deity, ministering of the angel Moroni, discovery of the gold plates and translation of the Book of Mormon, bestowal of priesthood authority, an account of the "Missouri Mormon War", and Smith's original Articles of Faith.
- Mackay, Michael Hubbard; Dirkmaat, Gerrit J.; Underwood, Grant; Woodford, Robert J.; Hartley, William G., eds. (8 November 2013). Documents, Volume 1: July 1828-June 1831. The Joseph Smith Papers: Documents Series (Book 1 of 10). Salt Lake City: The Church Historian's Press. ISBN 978-1609075774.
  - A collection including the first three years of what survives of Joseph Smith's papers, including letters sent and received, revelations, minutes of meetings, deeds and other financial papers, records of ecclesiastical administration; covering documentation of key events including the translation and publication of the Book of Mormon, the establishment of a church, and the mission by Oliver Cowdery and others to preach to American Indians on the western frontier of the United States.
- Roberts, B. H. (6 April 1930). Comprehensive History of The Church of Jesus Christ of Latter-day Saints: Century I. The LDS Church and Deseret News Press. ISBN 0842504826.
  - A six-volume history by a general authority and Assistant Church Historian of the LDS Church.
- Quinn, D. Michael (15 December 1994). The Mormon Hierarchy: Origins of Power. Signature Books. ISBN 1560850566.
  - An examination of the first two decades of LDS history and the move from Joseph Smith's charismatic spontaneity, and the egalitarian chaos of the early church, to Brigham Young's well-defined structure and the bureaucratization of Mormonism.
- Grow, Matthew J.; Smith, R. Eric, eds. (4 September 2017). The Council of Fifty: What the Records Reveal about Mormon History. RSC BYU, Deseret Book. ISBN 978-1944394219.
  - A compilation of fifteen brief essays on new insights found in the previously unavailable minutes of the Council of Fifty; historians who analyze the records include Richard Lyman Bushman, Richard E. Turley Jr., Spencer W. McBride, Patrick Q. Mason, Benjamin E. Park, Nathan B. Oman, Gerrit J. Dirkmaat, R. Eric Smith, Matthew J. Grow, Marilyn Bradford, Jeffrey D. Mahas, Matthew C. Godfrey, Christopher James Blythe, Richard E. Bennett, Jedediah S. Rogers, and W. Paul Reeve.
- Hunter, J. Michael, ed. (5 December 2012). Mormons and Popular Culture: The Global Influence of an American Phenomenon. ABC-CLIO. ISBN 978-0313391675.
  - A collection of essays on influential Mormons in American popular culture; in cinema, television, drama, theater, and music; with specific chapters on Disney, Philo T. Farnsworth, the Hill Cumorah Pageant, the Mormon Tabernacle Choir, Rose Marie Reid, and a selection of Mormon actors.
- Nibley, Hugh (1 November 1987). Compton, Todd; Ricks, Stephen D. (eds.). Mormonism and Early Christianity. The Collected Works of Hugh Nibley. Salt Lake City: Deseret Book. ISBN 0-87579-127-1.
  - A collection of essays about primitive Christianity, with particular focus on the connection between the practices and the doctrines of the early Church and the LDS Church.
- Bates, Irene M.; Smith, E. Gary (2017) [1996]. Lost Legacy: The Mormon Office of Presiding Patriarch (expanded ed.). University of Illinois Press. ISBN 978-0252083099.
  - A study of the office of Presiding Patriarch in the LDS Church; chronicling its history.

== Mormon studies ==
- Quinn, D. Michael, ed. (15 January 1992). The New Mormon History: Revisionist Essays on the Mormon Past. Signature Books. ISBN 1560850116.
  - A collection of 15 essays taking a new look at events in Mormon history— such as the significance of the First Vision, the Nauvoo period, the miracle of the gulls, and Mormon polygamy; contributors include Leonard J. Arrington, Mario S. De Pillis, James B. Allen, Jan Shipps, Robert Bruce Flanders, Linda King Newell, Dean May, William G. Hartley, Maureen Ursenbach Beecher, Stanley S. Ivins, Eugene E. Campbell, Bruce L. Campbell, Kenneth L. Cannon II, Klaus J. Hansen, Thomas G. Alexander, Ronald W. Walker, and B. H. Roberts.
- Walker, Ronald W.; Whittaker, David J.; Allen, James B. (18 April 2001). Mormon History. Urbana, IL: University of Illinois Press. ISBN 0252026195.
  - A historiographical survey of how the writing of Mormon history has evolved since the establishment of the church; a companion volume to the bibliography, Studies in Mormon History, 1830–1997; includes a contribution by Armand Mauss.
- Allen, James B.; Walker, Ronald W.; Whittaker, David (13 January 2000). Studies in Mormon History, 1830–1997: An Indexed Bibliography. Urbana: University of Illinois Press. ISBN 0252025652.
  - A bibliography on historical literature about the Mormons; listing books, articles, theses, and dissertations on the history of the LDS Church.
- Arrington, Leonard J. (15 November 2006). Neilson, Reid L.; Walker, Ronald W. (eds.). Reflections of a Mormon Historian: Leonard J. Arrington on the New Mormon History. Norman, OK: Arthur H. Clark Company. ISBN 0870623486.
  - Compilation of fourteen essays on history and the Mormons by Arrington, the first professional historian to serve as Church Historian, and a prominent founder of the New Mormon history; includes a biographical sketch by Walker, a bibliography of his works and speeches by Whitaker, and a personal tribute by his daughter, Susan Arrington Madsen.
- Vogel, Dan (1 February 1988). Religious Seekers and the Advent of Mormonism. Signature Books. ISBN 0941214648.
  - A study of the early history of the Church, introducing readers to groups and individuals who seem to have anticipated its kind of religious primitivism, especially the Seekers (who resembled Mormonism's concept of authority during its formative years).
- Bowman, Matthew (28 August 2012). The Mormon People: The Making of an American Faith. Random House Trade Paperbacks. ISBN 978-0812983364.
  - Survey of Mormon history and doctrine; recounting the church's origins, explaining the evolution of the Mormon vision, and its place in American public life.
- Taysom, Stephen C., ed. (15 June 2011). Dimensions of Faith: A Mormon Studies Reader. Salt Lake City: Signature Books. ISBN 978-1560852124.
  - Seventeen articles on a range of topics including David O. McKay's personality, comparisons of John Humphrey Noyes with Joseph Smith, Wilford Woodruff's vision of the signers of the Declaration of Independence, a "Mormon Bigfoot", Mormon ritual healing, the campaign to suppress anti-Mormon motion pictures, Mormon representations of Judaism, Mormon women's fiction, Edward Tullidge and the women of Mormondom; contributors include Kathleen Flake, Newell Bringhurst, Claudia Bushman, and Douglas Davies.
- Newell, Quincy D.; Mason, Eric Farrel, eds. (14 March 2013). New Perspectives in Mormon Studies: Creating and Crossing Boundaries. Norman, Oklahoma: University of Oklahoma Press. ISBN 978-0806143132.
  - A collection of essays with topics include Joseph Smith's political economy, Jane James's place in LDS history, the young Joseph Smith and Presbyterianism, the relation of Pentecostalism to Mormonism in the case of John Alexander Dowie, some comparative observations of Islam and Mormonism, the Ex-Mormons For Jesus/Saints Alive In Jesus, who Elias is, and LDS engagement with Dead Sea Scrolls scholarship; contributors include David Charles Gore, Quincy D. Newell, John Matzko, D. William Faupel, Grant Underwood, Sara M. Patterson, Stevan Davies, Eric F. Mason, and Richard Lyman Bushman.
- Hill, Marvin S. (1 June 1989). Quest for Refuge: The Mormon Flight from American Pluralism. Signature Books. ISBN 0941214702.
  - A history of the development of Mormon doctrines and the attempt to develop a communal utopia under a theocratic government during the 1830s and early 1840s; an interpretation of the LDS movement as a reaction to the diminishing role of religion in an emerging democratic, competitive, and increasingly secular world.

=== Regional studies ===
==== Britain ====
- Allen, James B.; Esplin, Ronald K.; Whittaker, David J. (1992). Men with a Mission: The Quorum of the Twelve Apostles in the British Isles, 1837–1841. Salt Lake City, Utah: Deseret Book. ISBN 1590389980. Republished on 13 May 2009.
  - History of the Quorum of the Twelve's mission to the United Kingdom.
- Jensen, Richard L.; Thorp, Malcolm R., eds. (1989). Mormons in Early Victorian Britain. Publications in Mormon Studies, Volume 4. Salt Lake City: University of Utah Press. ISBN 0874803225.
  - A collection of 16 biographical, local, background, and general articles on Mormonism in the British Isles, emphasizing the period of 1840 to the late 1850s; written by a mix historians of British history, and of American history.

==== Denmark ====
- Allen, Julie K. (30 May 2017). Danish But Not Lutheran: The Impact of Mormonism on Danish Cultural Identity, 1850-1920. University of Utah Press.
  - Story of the social and cultural ramifications of Danish conversions to Mormonism; explores the range of Danish public reactions over a seventy-year period.

==== Italy ====
- Toronto, James A.; Dursteler, Eric R.; Homer, Michael W. (2 January 2017). Mormons in the Piazza: History of the Latter-Day Saints in Italy. BYU Religious Studies Center. ISBN 978-1944394103.
  - An account and analysis of the people, events, and issues relevant to LDS missionary efforts in Italy.

==== Pacific Islands ====
- Underwood, Grant, ed. (1 December 2000). Voyages of Faith: Explorations in Mormon Pacific History. Studies in Latter-day Saint History series (Book 2). Provo, Utah: Brigham Young University. ISBN 0842524800.
  - A compilation of scholarly research, personal reminiscences, and faith stories of LDS Church missionary work among the Pacific Islands from 1843 onward; including articles on the work in French Polynesia and Tonga, influence on Maori religious identity, the founding of Iosepa, a rich history in Hawaii, the site selection of the Church College of Hawai'i campus, the art and architecture of the Laie Hawaii Temple (and a purported 7 December 1941 attack attempt), and reflections on the Polynesian Cultural Center).
- Underwood, Grant, ed. (2005). Pioneers in the Pacific: Memory, History, and Cultural Identity Among the Latter-Day Saints. Provo, Utah: Religious Studies Center, BYU. ISBN 0842526161.
  - Collection of articles and remembrances on the history of the LDS Church throughout the Pacific Islands up to the year 2004; including an address by Gordon B. Hinckley, an article on Matthew Cowley, the cultural foundations of the Polynesian Cultural Center, George Q. Cannon's mission in Hawai'i, and David O. McKay's 1921 trip around the Pacific.

==== Japan ====
- Neilson, Reid Larkin (2010). Early Mormon Missionary Activities in Japan, 1901-1924. University of Utah Press. ISBN 9780874809893.
  - Study of the early history LDS Missionary efforts in Japan; the challenges of adapting their message to the cultures encountered in East Asia.

==== Korea ====
- Palmer, Spencer J.; Palmer, Shirley H., eds. (1995). The Korean Saints: Personal Stories of Trial and Triumph, 1950–1980. Provo, Utah: Religious Education, Brigham Young University. ISBN 0875798888.
  - Collection of essays about the LDS Church in Korea.

==== American South ====
- Mason, Patrick Q. (16 February 2011). The Mormon Menace: Violence and Anti-Mormonism in the Postbellum South. Oxford University Press. ISBN 978-0199740024.
  - History of late nineteenth century Anti-Mormonism in the American South; which sometimes rose to the level of vigilante violence.

== Sacred works ==
=== The Book of Mormon ===
- Hardy, Grant, ed. (10 August 2005). The Book of Mormon: A Reader's Edition. University of Illinois Press. ISBN 025207341X.
  - A reader-friendly version reformating the complete, unchanged 1920 text in the manner of modern translations of the Bible, with paragraphs, quotations marks, poetic forms, topical headings, multichapter headings, indention of quoted documents, italicized reworkings of biblical prophecies, and minimized verse numbers; also featuring a hypothetical map based on internal references, an essay on Book of Mormon poetry, a full glossary of names, genealogical charts, a basic bibliography of Mormon and non-Mormon scholarship, a chronology of the translation, eyewitness accounts of the gold plates, and information regarding the lost 116 pages and significant changes in the text.
- Hardy, Grant (7 April 2010). Understanding the Book of Mormon: A Reader's Guide. Oxford University Press. ISBN 978-0199731701.
  - An analysis of the work's narrative structure; takes readers through its characters, events, and ideas, as it explores the story and its messages; seeks to reconcile believing and nonbelieving readings by offering a literary approach.
- Nyman, Monte S. (1 September 1991). The Most Correct Book: Why the Book of Mormon is the Keystone Scripture. Salt Lake City, Utah: Bookcraft. ISBN 088494798X.
  - Mostly written with a beginner in mind; it makes a case for Joseph Smith's description of the Book of Mormon as "the most correct of any book on earth, and the keystone of our religion," and that "a man would get nearer to God by abiding by its precepts, than by any other book."

=== Others ===
- Rosenvall, Lynn A.; Rosenvall, David L. (24 November 2017). A New Approach to Studying the Covenants of Our Fathers: A Harmony of Genesis, Moses and Abraham. Olive Leaf Foundation. ISBN 978-0998717814.
  - Presents the text of the Book of Genesis, Book of Moses, and Book of Abraham into 186 events or episodes placed in chronological sequence; in an effort to present the primeval history of the Genesis creation narrative in a comprehensive harmonized structure.

=== Criticism ===
- Palmer, Grant H. (15 November 2002). An Insider's View of Mormon Origins. Salt Lake City: Signature Books. ISBN 1560851570.
  - Examination of the contents of the Book of Mormon, challenging the claim of ancient origin; by a retired CES instructor and Institute director.
- Persuitte, David (1 September 2000) [1985]. Joseph Smith and the Origins of the Book of Mormon (second expanded ed.). Jefferson, NC: McFarland. ISBN 078640826X.
  - Biographical sketch of Joseph Smith with background information about the origin of the Book of Mormon; posits the idea that Smith used the 1823 work View of the Hebrews as a source of ideas in creating the Book.
- Larson, Charles M. (1 March 1992). By His Own Hand Upon Papyrus: A New Look at the Joseph Smith Papyri. Institute for Religious Research. ISBN 0962096326.
  - Critical examination of the Egyptian papyri from which Joseph Smith purportedly translated the Book of Abraham.

== Beliefs and practices ==
- Millet, Robert L. (1 March 1998). The Mormon Faith: A New Look at Christianity. Shadow Mountain. ISBN 1573453595.
  - A series of essays examining the theology and doctrine of the LDS Church; written primarily as an introduction for non-members; an overview of the LDS views of God, scripture, Jesus, the nature and destiny of man, grace and salvation, the sacraments, the priesthood, the purpose of the temples, revelation and eschatology.
- Smith, Joseph Jr. (1985) [1835]. Lectures on Faith. Salt Lake City, Utah: Deseret Book. ISBN 087747897X.
  - A set of seven lectures on the doctrine and theology of the Church of Jesus Christ of Latter Day Saints, first published as the doctrine portion of the canonical Doctrine and Covenants, but later removed from that work; originally presented to a group of Elders in a "School of the Prophets" course in the early winter of 1834–35 in Kirtland, Ohio.
- Young, Brigham (1 June 1954) [1925]. Widtsoe, John A. (ed.). Discourses of Brigham Young. Salt Lake City, Utah: Deseret Book. ISBN 0877470669.
  - Collection of pronouncements by the Second President of the LDS Church, primarily from the Journal of Discourses, arranged by topic.
- Smith, Joseph F. (2015) [1919]. Widtsoe, John Andreas (ed.). Gospel Doctrine: Selections From the Sermons and Writings of Joseph F. Smith. Salt Lake City, Utah: The Deseret News. ISBN 978-1333356347.
  - Collection of teachings from the 6th president of the LDS Church (from 1901 to 1918); first published as a course of study for Melchizedek Priesthood quorums.
- Talmage, James E. (1915). Jesus the Christ: A Study of the Messiah and His Mission According to the Holy Scriptures Both Ancient and Modern. Salt Lake City, Utah: Deseret Book. ISBN 1598111957.
- Talmage, James Edward (1915). Jesus the Christ: A Study of the Messiah and His Mission According to Holy Scriptures Both Ancient and Modern. Deseret News. ISBN 0877479038.
  - Viewed by the LDS Church as a classic text on its teachings and beliefs concerning the life and ministry of Jesus; by an Apostle.
- Smith, Joseph Fielding (1999) [1954]. McConkie, Bruce R. (ed.). Doctrines of Salvation: Sermons and Writings of Joseph Fielding Smith (3-in-1 ed.). Salt Lake City, Utah: Bookcraft. ISBN 157008646X.
  - Three volume collection on an array of gospel topics by then President of the Quorum of Twelve; the nature of our life in the pre-existence; the true story of creation; the age of the earth; the theory of evolution and the Gospel; the Adam-God theory; distinguishing between true and false revelation.
- Richards, Franklin Dewey (1857). A Compendium of the Faith and Doctrines of the Church of Jesus Christ of Latter-day Saints: Compiled from the Bible; and Also from the Book of Mormon, Doctrine and Covenants, and Other Publications of the Church. Orson Pratt. ISBN 1331100658.
  - A lengthy reference work combining doctrine and history; each chapter summarizes a particular doctrine followed by scriptural references from the standard works, and any relevant statements from Joseph Smith; a favorite of field missionaries at the time.
- McConkie, Bruce R. (1979) [1958]. Mormon Doctrine (revised second ed.). Bookcraft. ISBN 0884944468. (Originally subtitled A Compendium of the Gospel).
  - An encyclopedic work written by a general authority of the LDS Church; intended primarily for a LDS audience, it covered a wide array of gospel topics in much detail; very popular among average Church members.
- Jaques, John (1888) [1854]. Catechism for Children: Exhibiting the Prominent Doctrines of the Church of Jesus Christ of Latter-day Saints. Deseret News. ISBN 1333042817.
  - Originally serialized in the LDS Millennial Star, this basic instructional work was very popular among Latter-day Saints.
- Roberts, B. H. (1995). Larson, Stan (ed.). The Truth, the Way, the Life: An Elementary Treatise on Theology: The Masterwork of B.H. Roberts. Signature Books. ISBN 1560850779.
  - An attempt to consolidate the author's "theological thought into a unified whole and to reconcile science with scripture." Deemed too controversial by the LDS First Presidency and Quorum of the Twelve, it went unpublished for over 60 years.
- Underwood, Grant (1 March 1999) [1993]. The Millenarian World of Early Mormonism. Urbana: University of Illinois. ISBN 0252068262.
  - A detailed study of early Mormon thought about the "end times"; exploring early LDS interpretation of the Bible and the Book of Mormon affecting Mormon millennial doctrines.
- Toscano, Margaret Merrill; Toscano, Paul (1990). Strangers in Paradox: Explorations in Mormon Theology. Signature Books. ISBN 0941214982.
  - A controversial book by one of the September Six and his wife (who some view as a "seventh" member of the Six); explores a range of theological issues, such as the nature of God, gender roles, religious authority, and symbolism.
- McMurrin, Sterling M. (2000) [1965]. The Theological Foundations of the Mormon Religion: And, the Philosophical Foundations of Mormon Theology. Signature Books. ISBN 156085135X.
  - Philosophical study of the similarities between Mormonism and Hellenistic Christianity; and Mormonism's contribution to the overall pursuit of life's fundamental, ontological questions.
- Kimball, Edward L. (2006) [1978]. The Teachings of Spencer W. Kimball. Deseret Books. ISBN 1570089388.
  - Collection of sermons and writings by Spencer W. Kimball, a LDS Apostle (from 1943 to 1985) and Church President (from 1973 to 1985); quotations aiming to provide instruction and inspiration on a wide range of gospel topics.
- Spencer, Orson; Crowel, William (1848). Letters Exhibiting the Most Prominent Doctrines of the Church of Jesus Christ of Latter-day Saints: In Reply to Rev. William Crowel. Deseret News Company. ISBN 137544607X.
  - A series of letters from Rev. Crowell (a Baptist former colleague) inquiring about Spencer's conversion to the Mormon faith, together Spencer's responses.
- Talmage, James Edward (1909). The Great Apostasy: Considered in the Light of Scriptural and Secular History. Deseret News. ISBN 1628451181.
  - Summarizes the Great Apostasy from the viewpoint of the LDS Church; was once one of the few non-scriptural books which full-time LDS missionaries were encouraged to study; it has gone through many editions and continues to be published.
- Hinckley, Gordon B. (22 February 2000). Standing for Something: Ten Neglected Virtues that Will Heal Our Hearts and Homes. Times Books. ISBN 0812933176.
  - A self-improvement book, by then president of the LDS Church; foreword by Mike Wallace.

== Special topics ==
=== Death ===
- Nelson, Russell M. (1995). The Gateway We Call Death. Deseret Book Company. ISBN 0875799531.
  - An approach to the subject of death from both a medical and a theological point of view by a (then) LDS Apostle; discussing topics such as the purpose of life and of death; the purpose of mourning; factors of choice, such as suicide, euthanasia, and use of mechanical means to extend life; and life after death.
- Brown, Samuel Morris (1 December 2011). In Heaven as It Is on Earth: Joseph Smith and the Early Mormon Conquest of Death. Oxford University Press, USA. ISBN 978-0199793570.
  - Narrative history of the foundational beliefs of early Mormonism; interpreting them through the lens of Joseph Smith's preoccupation with death.

=== Evolution ===
- Smith, Joseph Fielding (1954). Man, His Origin and Destiny. Salt Lake City: Deseret Book.
  - Challenge to the "hypothesis of organic evolution"; written by the then President of the Quorum of the Twelve Apostles of the LDS Church.
- Evenson, William E.; Jeffery, Duane E. (11 January 2006). Mormonism and Evolution: The Authoritative LDS Statements. Salt Lake City: Greg Kofford Books. ISBN 1589580931.
  - Compilation of all known authoritative statements by LDS Church leaders on the topics of evolution and the origin of human beings; with historical context for the statements.
- Stephens, Trent D.; Meldrum, D. Jeffrey; Peterson, Forrest B. (15 February 2001). Evolution and Mormonism: A Quest for Understanding. Salt Lake City: Signature Books. ISBN 1560851422.
  - A review the scientific data about how life developed on Earth, written for a general LDS audience.
- Sessions, Gene A.; Oberg, Craig J., eds. (1 March 1993). The Search for Harmony: Essays on Science and Mormonism. Salt Lake City: Signature Books. ISBN 1560850205.
  - Compilation of essays on the theological implications of science, by LDS scientists.
- Paul, Erich Robert (1 June 1992). Science, Religion, and Mormon Cosmology. Urbana: University of Illinois Press. ISBN 0252018958.
  - Historical survey of the LDS Church's varied relationship to science.

=== Occult aspects ===
- Quinn, D. Michael (15 December 1998) [1987]. Early Mormonism and the Magic World View (Revised and enlarged ed.). Salt Lake City: Signature Books. ISBN 1560850892.
  - Study of the role of 19th-century New England folk magic lore in Joseph Smith's early visions and in the development of the Book of Mormon.
- Reeve, W. Paul; Wagenen, Michael Scott Van, eds. (23 May 2011). Between Pulpit and Pew: The Supernatural World in Mormon History and Folklore. Utah State University Press. ISBN 978-0874218381.
  - An exploration of Mormon cultural and religious history through a collection of folklore, supernatural legends and events; including stories of Cain as a Bigfoot, the Gadianton robbers, UFOs, the Dream Mine, and a Utah version of Nessie.
- Brooke, John L. (31 May 1996). The Refiner's Fire: The Making of Mormon Cosmology, 1644-1844. Cambridge University Press. ISBN 0521565642.
  - A history of the roots of Mormon theology; contending that its origins lie in the fusion of radical religion with occult ideas.

=== Politics ===
- Flake, Kathleen (22 March 2004). The Politics of American Religious Identity: The Seating of Senator Reed Smoot, Mormon Apostle. University of North Carolina Press. ISBN 0807855014.
  - Analysis of the Reed Smoot hearings and their impact on the "Mormon Problem."
- Bringhurst, Newell G.; Foster, Craig L. (11 September 2011) [2008]. The Mormon Quest for the Presidency: From Joseph Smith to Mitt Romney and Jon Huntsman (expanded and updated volume). John Whitmer Books. ISBN 978-1934901090.
  - A detailed description of the campaigns of 11 Mormons (including ex-Mormons and soon-to-be Mormons) who ran for the presidency of the United States; it includes the third-party runs of Joseph Smith (1844), Parley P. Christensen (1920), Ezra Taft Benson (1968), Eldridge Cleaver (1968), Sonia Johnson (1984), and Bo Gritz (1992); and the major-party runs of George Romney (1968), Mo Udall (1976), Orrin Hatch (2000), Mitt Romney (2008) and 2012) and Jon Huntsman (2012).

=== Polygamy ===
- Compton, Todd M. (15 December 1997). In Sacred Loneliness: The Plural Wives of Joseph Smith. Salt Lake City: Signature Books. ISBN 156085085X.
  - Biographical look at each of the 33 women who married Joseph Smith.
- Bringhurst, Newell G.; Foster, Craig L., eds. (1 November 2010). The Persistence of Polygamy: Joseph Smith and the Origins of Mormon Polygamy. John Whitmer Books. ISBN 978-1934901137.
  - First of three volumes, collecting essays on the relationship of Joseph Smith to Fanny Alger, analysis of Section 132 of the LDS Doctrine and Covenants (including the RLDS Church's reaction), Joseph Smith and polyandry; contributors include Todd M. Compton, Ugo A. Perego, and Linda King Newell.
- Bringhurst, Newell G.; Foster, Craig L., eds. (13 September 2013). The Persistence of Polygamy: From Joseph Smith's Martyrdom to the First Manifesto, 1844-1890. John Whitmer Books. ISBN 978-1934901144.
  - Second of three volumes, collecting essays on plural marriage as practiced by Brigham Young, the plural wives of Prophets from Young to Heber J. Grant, Strangites, William Smith, Lyman Wight, Alpheus Cutler, nineteenth-century Mormon female activism, the incarceration of Mormon plural wives, and the RLDS Church's directive on baptism of Saora tribal polygamists; contributors include George D. Smith and Richard P. Howard.
- Bringhurst, Newell G.; Foster, Craig L., eds. (17 August 2015). Persistence of Polygamy: Fundamentalist Mormon Polygamy from 1890 to the Present. John Whitmer Books. ISBN 978-1934901168.
  - Third of three volumes, collecting seventeen original essays on the history of plural marriage among fundamentalist Mormons—who persisted in the practice after LDS Church President Wilford Woodruff's 1890 Manifesto; provides a history of mainstream LDS polygamy in Mexico, John Taylor's controversial 1886 Revelation, portraits of fundamentalist Mormon leaders such as Joseph White Musser, Rulon C. Allred, Rulon T. Jeffs, and Warren S. Jeffs, the 1980s schism between the FLDS church and Centennial Park Community, the 2008 Texas raid on the FLDS YFZ Ranch, and modern media stereotyping of Mormon polygamy, the changing style of fundamentalist clothing and hair styles.

=== Race ===
- Bringhurst, Newell G.; Smith, Darron T., eds. (2004). Black and Mormon. Urbana: University of Illinois Press. ISBN 0-252-02947-X.
  - A collection of articles about Black people and Mormonism, race and the LDS priesthood, and the experience of Black Mormons.
- Reeve, W. Paul (27 February 2015). Religion of a Different Color: Race and the Mormon Struggle for Whiteness. Oxford University Press. ISBN 978-0199754076.
  - A study of Mormonism's struggle for status and recognition, in the context of how Protestants racialized Mormons.
- Mueller, Max Perry (11 September 2017). Race and the Making of the Mormon People. Chapel Hill, NC: The University of North Carolina Press. ISBN 978-1469636160.
  - A study of the history of evolving Mormon concepts of race.
- Carter, Kate B. (1965). The Story of the Negro Pioneer. Daughters of Utah Pioneers.
  - The stories of Black Mormons who emigrated to Utah; such as Jane Manning James, Elijah Abel, and Liz Flake Rowan.
- Garrett, Matthew (31 December 2016). Making Lamanites: Mormons, Native Americans, and the Indian Student Placement Program, 1947-2000. University of Utah Press. ISBN 978-1607815693.
  - Study of the Lamanite Placement Program.
- Harris, Matthew L.; Bringhurst, Newell G., eds. (15 November 2015). The Mormon Church and Blacks: A Documentary History. University of Illinois Press. ISBN 978-0252097843.
  - A collection of thirty official or authoritative Church statements on the status of African Americans in the LDS Church; with editorial comments and analysis, contextualizing each within the history of race and religion in the US.
- Bush, Lester E.; Mauss, Armand L., eds. (1984). Neither White Nor Black: Mormon Scholars Confront the Race Issue in a Universal Church. Signature Books. ISBN 0941214222.
  - Collection of essays by the editors, and Newell G. Bringhurst, most of which originally appeared in Dialogue.
- Mauss, Armand L. (2003). All Abraham's Children: Changing Mormon Conceptions of Race and Lineage. University of Illinois Press. ISBN 0252028031.
  - Study of the evolution of traditional Mormon beliefs and practices concerning minorities; examining how members of the LDS Church have defined themselves and others in terms of racial lineages.
- Southerton, Simon G. (2004). Losing a Lost Tribe: Native Americans, DNA, and the Mormon Church. Signature Books.
  - A molecular biologist's explanation of DNA research on Native Americans and Polynesians origins, conflicting with standard LDS Church teachings.

=== Sexuality ===
- Christofferson, Tom (25 October 2017). That We May Be One: A Gay Mormon's Perspective on Faith and Family. Salt Lake City, Utah: Deseret Book. ISBN 978-1629723914.
  - Perspectives of a self-described "happy gay Mormon"; a brother of LDS Apostle D. Todd Christofferson, who left the Church, and then returned to it.
- Quinn, D. Michael (20 June 2001) [1996]. Same-Sex Dynamics Among Nineteenth-Century Americans: A Mormon Example. University of Illinois Press. ISBN 0252069587.
  - Historical survey the tolerance of same-sex relationships by the LDS Church, before the onset of homophobia in the late 1950s.
- Corcoran, Brent, ed. (1994). Multiply and Replenish: Mormon Essays on Sex and Family. Signature Books. ISBN 1560850507.
  - Collection of 13 essays on the evolution of Mormon attitudes about sexual practices (including homosexuality), polygamy, and celestial marriage; authors include Eugene England and Levi S. Peterson.
- Kimball, Spencer W. (2002) [1969]. The Miracle of Forgiveness. Deseret Book Company. ISBN 0884941922.
  - Once popular work about the atonement, repentance, and the plan of salvation by a, then, Apostle of the LDS Church; controversial for its treatment of masturbation, homosexuality, premarital sex, and rape.

=== Temples ===
- Talmage, James Edward (1912). The House of the Lord: A Study of Holy Sanctuaries, Ancient and Modern. Deseret News. ISBN 1499640358.
  - Published by the LDS Church, it discusses the doctrine, purpose, and importance of temples; the first book to contain photographs of the interiors of Mormon temples (including those in Kirtland, Nauvoo, Salt Lake, St. George, Logan, and Manti).
- Packer, Boyd K. (1 October 2007) [1980]. The Holy Temple. Bookcraft/Deseret Book Company. ISBN 978-0884944119.
  - LDS Apostle discusses the doctrine and purpose of the temples, including an explanation of the entrance requirements; also explains why Church teachings focus on family history and genealogy; Deseret Book published an extended, illustrated version of the book in 2007.

=== Violence ===
- Denton, Sally (17 June 2003). American Massacre: The Tragedy at Mountain Meadows, September 1857 (First ed.). New York: Alfred A. Knopf. ISBN 0-375-41208-5.
  - History of the Mountain Meadows Massacre.
- Bagley, Will (2002). Blood of the Prophets: Brigham Young and the Massacre at Mountain Meadows. Norman, OK: University of Oklahoma Press. ISBN 0-8061-3426-7.
  - History of the Mountain Meadows Massacre; the author posits that Brigham Young ordered the massacre.
- Walker, Ronald W.; Turley, Richard E.; Leonard, Glen M. (9 February 2011). Massacre at Mountain Meadows. New York: Oxford University Press. ISBN 978-0199747566.
  - Account of the Mountain Meadows Massacre; written drawing from LDS Church documents previously not available to scholars.
- Turley, Richard E. Jr.; Walker, Ronald W., eds. (30 September 2009). Mountain Meadows Massacre: The Andrew Jenson and David H. Morris Collections. Provo, Utah: Brigham Young University Press. ISBN 978-0842527231.
  - A reproduction of two of the collections uncovered during research for Massacre at Mountain Meadows; one compiled in the 1890s by Andrew Jenson, the second a decade later by David H. Morris (1858–1937), an attorney and judge in St. George, Utah.
- Krakauer, Jon (2004). Under the Banner of Heaven: A Story of Violent Faith. Knopf Doubleday Publishing Group. ISBN 9781400078998.
  - Investigation of the histories of the LDS Church, and the crimes of a small splinter group called the School of Prophets; also examines the ideologies of both the LDS Church and the fundamentalist Mormon polygamous groups, such as the FLDS Church.
- Turley, Richard E. Jr. (1992). Victims: The LDS Church and the Mark Hofmann Case. Urbana: University of Illinois Press. ISBN 0252018850.
  - The story of the Mark Hofmann case, told from the perspectives of the murder victims and the LDS Church; written by an Assistant Church Historian with church leaders' support and access to interviews, diaries, journals, memoranda, and other records.

=== Women ===
- Daughters in My Kingdom: The History and Work of Relief Society. The Christopher Publishing House. 2011.
  - Comprehensive history of the Relief Society, produced by the LDS Church; written by Susan W. Tanner.
- Hanks, Maxine, ed. (1992). Women and Authority: Re-emerging Mormon Feminism. Salt Lake City, Utah: Signature Books. ISBN 1560850140.
  - Collection of essays compiled by a Mormon feminist theologian, exploring issues of women's spirituality and authority within the LDS Church; the Mormon concept of a mother in heaven; and the relationship of Mormon women and priesthood. Contributors include Linda King Newell, Meg Wheatley, Todd Compton, Lavina Fielding Anderson, Carol Lynn Pearson, D. Michael Quinn, and Margaret Merrill Toscano.
- Brooks, Joanna; Steenblik, Rachel Hunt; Wheelwright, Hannah, eds. (2 November 2015). Mormon Feminism: Essential Writings. New York, NY: Oxford University Press. ISBN 978-0190248031.
  - A collection of writings and speeches from four decades of the modern Mormon feminist movement; a guide to understand the history of gender in Mormonism. Contributors include Claudia Lauper Bushman, Sonia Johnson, Linda King Newell, Carol Cornwall Madsen, Laurel Thatcher Ulrich, Mary Lythgoe Bradford, Margaret Merrill Toscano, Linda Sillitoe, Carol Lynn Pearson, Janice Merrill Allred, Chieko Nishimura Okazaki, Lisa Butterworth, Valerie Hudson Cassler, Neylan McBaine, Kate Kelly, and Lani Wendt Young.
- Shepherd, Gordon; Anderson, Lavina Fielding; Shepherd, Gary, eds. (29 July 2015). Voices for Equality: Ordain Women and Resurgent Mormon Feminism. Salt Lake City: Greg Kofford Books. ISBN 978-1589587588.
  - A collection of articles by twenty-five scholars and activists on the issue of gender equality in the LDS Church; examines the high public visibility of the Ordain Women movement, and details the theological debates about gender and priesthood authority.
- Davidson, Karen Lynn; Derr, Jill Mulvay (2013). Eliza: The Life and Faith of Eliza R. Snow. Deseret Book. ISBN 978-1609089023.
  - Biography of Eliza R. Snow, 2nd President of the Relief Society (from 1866 to 1887).
- Bradley, Martha Sonntag (18 October 2005). Pedestals and Podiums: Utah Women, Religious Authority, and Equal Rights. Signature Books. ISBN 1560851899.
  - A survey of the involvement of Mormons in the women's movement (including early Utah leaders such as Emmeline B. Wells) and the shift to championing a more conservative view of women's roles; culminating in the concerted effort to defeat the Equal Rights Amendment (ERA).
- Ulrich, Laurel Thatcher (10 January 2017). A House Full of Females: Plural Marriage and Women's Rights in Early Mormonism, 1835-1870. Knopf Doubleday Publishing Group. ISBN 978-0307594907.
  - A history of marriage and family life among first-generation Latter-day Saints; focused on the world of early Mormon women— pieced together through diaries, letters, albums, minute-books, and quilts— their practice of "plural marriage," and their attainment of female suffrage.
- Holbrook, Kate; Bowman, Matthew Burton (30 May 2016). Women and Mormonism: Historical and Contemporary Perspectives. University of Utah Press. ISBN 978-1607814771.
  - A collection of essays on the experience of LDS women in a predominantly male-led church; topics include Jane Manning James, Mother in Heaven, and the intersecting paths of Mormon and Roman Catholic feminists; contributors include lay members and scholars, including both LDS and non-LDS viewpoints: Catherine Brekus, Laurel Thatcher Ulrich, Rachel Cope, Jennifer Reeder, Kristine Wright, Jonathan Stapley, Susanna Morrill, Quincy D. Newell, Amanda Hendrix-Komoto, Rebekah Ryan Clark, David E. Campbell, Carine Decoo-Vanwelkenhuysen, Melissa Wei-Tsing Inouye, Jennifer Finlayson-Fife, Claudia Bushman, P. Jane Hafen, Neylan McBaine, Aimee Evans Hickman, and Mary Farrell Bednarowski.

== Criticisms ==
- Howe, Eber D. (1834). Mormonism Unvailed. Painesville: self-published.
  - Contemporary exposé of early Mormonism; considered to be the first anti-Mormon book; republished as History of the Mormons in 1840.
- Beckwith, Francis; Mosser, Carl; Owen, Paul, eds. (2010) [2002]. The New Mormon Challenge: Responding to the Latest Defenses of a Fast-Growing Movement. Zondervan. ISBN 978-0310231943.
  - Evangelical Christian response to the challenge of Mormon apologetics; scholarly effort to rebut Mormon truth claims.
- Paulson, Matthew A. (5 September 2000). Breaking the Mormon Code. WingSpan Press. ISBN 1595940677.
  - Critique of FARMS scholarship; by a CARM researcher.
- Givens, Terryl (31 January 2013) [1997]. The Viper on the Hearth: Mormons, Myths, and the Construction of Heresy (Updated ed.). Oxford University Press USA. ISBN 978-0199933808.
  - Examination of the presence and reception of the Mormon image in contemporary culture; how nineteenth- and twentieth-century American writers frequently cast the Mormon as a stock villains in fiction; the updated edition has an expanded final chapter, on the Mormon presence in contemporary American culture, discussing the musical, The Book of Mormon, and the political campaigns of Mitt Romney and Jon Huntsman.
- Launius, Roger D.; Thatcher, Linda, eds. (1 April 1998). Differing Visions: Dissenters in Mormon History. University of Illinois Press. ISBN 0252067312.
  - An analysis of the careers of 18 converts who later left the LDS church— David Whitmer, John Corrill, William E. McLellin, Francis Gladden Bishop, James Colin Brewster, William B. Smith, Alpheus Cutler, Stephen Post, James and George Dove, Henry W. Lawrence, Frank J. Cannon, Joseph W. Musser, Fawn McKay Brodie, Maurine Whipple, Richard Price, Jerald and Sandra Tanner, and Sonia Johnson; contributors include Richard N. Holzapfel, John S. McCormick, Kenneth M. Godfrey, William D. Russell, Dan Vogel, and Jessie L. Embry.
- Burningham, Kay (2011). An American Fraud: One Lawyer's Case Against Mormonism. AmicaVeritatis. ISBN 978-0615465890.
  - A chronicle of the author's journey out of the LSD faith; and an exposé by a civil trial attorney, alleging fraud committed by generations of Mormon Leaders— misrepresentations resulting in damages (political, environmental, and psycho-social) to believers; presents The Book of Mormon as a 19th-century work of fiction

== Relations to other faiths ==
- Palmer, Spencer J.; Keller, Roger R. (1997) [1988]. Religions of the World: A Latter-day Saint View (2nd general revised and enlarged ed.). Provo, Utah: Brigham Young University. ISBN 0842523502.
  - Overviews a variety of the world's religions with commentary following each one; offering a LDS perspective, noting beliefs held in common, and divergences.
- Palmer, Spencer J., ed. (2002) [1983]. Mormons and Muslims: Spiritual Foundations and Modern Manifestations (updated and revised ed.). Religious Studies Center, Brigham Young University. ISBN 1591560233.
  - Collection of papers from a BYU symposium in October 1981; focuses on parallels, similarities, and contrasts with Islam and the LDS. Revised edition includes new material by Arnold H. Green and Daniel C. Peterson.
- Thomas, John Christopher (31 March 2016). A Pentecostal Reads the Book of Mormon: A Literary and Theological Introduction. CPT Press. ISBN 978-1935931553.
  - A monograph by a Pentecostal New Testament scholar offering an irenic, critical reading of the Book of Mormon; utilizing narrative analysis, it investigates of the book's overall structure; presents an extended reading focused on its literary and theological dimensions; and traces the book's reception amongst followers and opponents alike.

== Missionary work ==
- Neilson, Reid L.; Woods, Fred E., eds. (2012). Go Ye Into All the World: The Growth & Development of Mormon Missionary Work. Religious Studies Center, Brigham Young University. ISBN 978-0842528214.
  - A collection of essays bringing some of the stories of missionaries of the LDS Church to the study of Mormon missiology; the result of a BYU Church History Symposium.

== Branches and sects ==
- Shields, Steven L. (1990) [1975]. Divergent Paths of the Restoration: A History of the Latter Day Saint Movement (fourth, revised and enlarged ed.). Bountiful, Utah: Restoration Research. ISBN 0830905693.
  - Discusses the histories and theologies of more than a hundred different churches, organizations, and individuals in the Latter Day Saint movement.
- Bringhurst, Newell G.; Hamer, John C., eds. (2007). Scattering Of The Saints: Schism Within Mormonism. Independence, MO: John Whitmer Books. ISBN 978-1934901021.
  - A collection of sixteen original essays on different expressions of the Latter Day Saint movement; including groups which trace their path through Sidney Rigdon, Lyman Wight, James J. Strang, Alpheus Cutler, Granville Hedrick, David Whitmer, William Smith, and Amasa Lyman; outlines the history of fundamentalist Mormonism, and recent schisms within the Reorganized Latter Day Saint tradition. Includes contributions from Danny L. Jorgensen, Anne Wilde, and Roger D. Launius.

=== Community of Christ (RLDS Church) ===
- Davis, Inez Smith (1998) [1934]. The Story of the Church: A History of the Church of Jesus Christ of Latter Day Saints and of Its Legal Successor, the Reorganized Church of Jesus Christ of Latter Day Saints (thirteenth, updated ed.). Independence, MO: Herald Publishing House. ISBN 0830901884.
  - A history, by the daughter of RLDS Apostle and Church Historian Heman C. Smith.
- Edwards, Paul M. (1991). Our Legacy of Faith: A Brief History of the Reorganized Church of Jesus Christ of Latter Day Saints. Independence, MO: Herald Publishing House. ISBN 0830905944.
  - History of the RLDS Church, published by the Church.

=== Others ===
- Walker, Ronald W. (1 January 1998). Wayward Saints: The Godbeites and Brigham Young. Urbana: University of Illinois Press. ISBN 0252067053. Foreword by Jan Shipps. Republished by the University of Utah in 2009.
  - Chronicle of the Godbeites and their 1870s challenge to Brigham Young's leadership and authority; a collective biography of William S. Godbe, Elias L. T. Harrison, Edward W. Tullidge, Fanny and Thomas Stenhouse, Amasa M. Lyman, Henry W. Lawrence, and Eli B. Kelsey.

== Biographies ==
- Jenson, Andrew (1901–1936). Latter-Day Saint Biographical Encyclopedia: A Compilation of Biographical Sketches of Prominent Men and Women in the Church of Jesus Christ of Latter-Day Saints. Deseret News. ISBN 1589580273.
  - A four-volume biographical dictionary by an Assistant Church Historian; includes a church chronology and biographical information about leaders and other prominent members of the LDS Church from its founding in 1830 until 1930.

=== Joseph Smith ===
- Smith, Joseph (26 November 2008). Jessee, Dean; Esplin, Ronald; Bushman, Richard Lyman (eds.). The Joseph Smith Papers: Journals, Vol. 1: 1832-1839. Joseph Smith Papers: Journals Series (Book 1 of 3). Salt Lake City: Church Historian's Press. ISBN 978-1570088490.
  - Collection featuring Joseph Smith's first five journals; providing Smith's perspective on the Kirtland Temple, the origins of the "Missouri Mormon War", and the founding of what would become Nauvoo, Illinois.
- Smith, Joseph (15 November 2011). Hedges, Andrew H.; Smith, Alex D.; Anderson, Richard Lloyd (eds.). The Joseph Smith Papers: Journals, Vol. 2, December 1841–April 1843. Joseph Smith Papers: Journals Series (Book 2 of 3). Salt Lake City: Church Historian's Press. ISBN 978-1609087371.
  - Collection featuring Smith's first Nauvoo, Illinois journal, as well as part of the second; chronicling the organization of the Female Relief Society of Nauvoo, proxy baptism for the dead, publication of the Book of Abraham, construction of the Nauvoo Temple, agitation from dissenters such as John C. Bennett, and an attempts to have Smith extradited to Missouri for trial.
- Smith, Joseph (30 November 2015). Hedges, Andrew H.; Smith, Alex D.; Rogers, Brent M. (eds.). The Joseph Smith Papers: Journals, Volume 3: May 1843-June 1844. Joseph Smith Papers: Journals Series (Book 3 of 3). Salt Lake City: Church Historian's Press. ISBN 978-1629721477.
  - Collection featuring journal entries from the last year of Smith's life; discussing topics including humanity's potential to become like God, establishment of the Council of Fifty, Smith's candidacy for United States president, and escalating conflict against Smith and the church. Includes appendixes with accounts from Willard Richards and William Clayton of the murder of Joseph and Hyrum Smith.
- Smith, Lucy Mack (1853). Biographical Sketches Of Joseph Smith, The Prophet, And His Progenitors For Many Generations. Liverpool: Orson Pratt. ISBN 1425483836.
  - Republished under several titles, including History of Joseph Smith by His Mother
- Brodie, Fawn M. (1 August 1995) [1945]. No Man Knows My History: The Life of Joseph Smith, the Mormon Prophet (2nd revised & enlarged ed.). Vintage Books. ISBN 0679730540.
  - Known as the first important non-hagiographic biography of Joseph Smith; continually in print for over seven decades.
- Remini, Robert Vincent (2002). Joseph Smith. Penguin. ISBN 067003083X.
  - A scholarly attempt at an objective portrayal of Joseph Smith by a historian of the Jacksonian era; part of the Penguin Lives book series.
- Vogel, Dan (2004). Joseph Smith: The Making of a Prophet. Signature Books. ISBN 1560851791.
  - A biography of the formative years, covering the period of Smith's life up until 1831; argues that Smith was a pious fraud, interpreting the Book of Mormon as springing from his psychology and experiences.
- Caswall, Henry (1843). The Prophet of the Nineteenth Century: Or, The Rise, Progress, and Present State of the Mormons, Or Latter-day Saints: to which is Appended, an Analysis of the Book of Mormon. J. G. F. & J. Rivington. ISBN 1435751701.
  - The first biography ever written on Joseph Smith; a hostile account.
- Evans, John Henry (1 December 1989) [1933]. Joseph Smith: An American Prophet. Deseret Book Company. ISBN 0875792154.
  - Faithful biography presenting Smith "as a greater leader than Moses and a greater prophet than Isaiah.
- Hill, Donna (15 March 1999) [1977]. Joseph Smith: The First Mormon. Signature Books. ISBN 156085118X.
  - Comprehensive biography by a Mormon historian; described as having a temperate, balanced, middle-of-the-road approach— in the spectrum of pro and con biographies.

=== Brigham Young ===
- Arrington, Leonard J. (1985). Brigham Young: American Moses. New York: Alfred A. Knopf. ISBN 0-394-51022-4.
  - Admiring biography of Brigham Young, the 2nd President of the LDS Church (from 1847–1877); nicknamed the "American Moses" because he led his followers in an exodus through a desert, to what they saw as a promised land.
- Bringhurst, Newell G. (1986). Handlin, Oscar (ed.). Brigham Young And The Expanding American Frontier. Boston: Little, Brown. ISBN 0316108227..
  - Part of the Library of American Biography Series. Republished on 24 January 1997 by Longman (ISBN 0-673-39322-4).

=== Others ===
- Newell, Linda King; Avery, Valeen Tippetts (1994) [1984]. Mormon Enigma: Emma Hale Smith, Prophet's Wife, "Elect Lady," Polygamy's Foe (second ed.). Urbana, IL: University of Illinois Press. ISBN 0252062914.
  - Award-winning biography of Emma Smith.
- Whitney, Orson F. (14 January 2017) [1888]. Life of Heber C. Kimball: An Apostle, The Father and Founder of the British Mission. Salt Lake City, Utah: Bookcraft. ISBN 978-1540792716.
  - Faithful biography of Heber C. Kimball, by his grandson.
- Walker, Ronald W. (1 August 2004). Qualities That Count: Heber J. Grant as Businessman, Missionary and Apostle. Provo, Utah: Brigham Young University. ISBN 0842525505.
  - Essay collection discussing Heber J. Grant's life and service; from his birth to middle age, prior to becoming the 7th President of the LDS Church (from 1918 to 1945).
- Prince, Gregory A.; Wright, Wm. Robert (9 March 2005). David O. McKay and the Rise of Modern Mormonism. Salt Lake City, Utah: University of Utah Press. ISBN 0-87480-822-7.
  - Biography of David O. McKay, the ninth president of the LDS Church (from 1951 to 1970).
- Avery, Valeen Tippetts (1 September 1998). From Mission to Madness: Last Son of the Mormon Prophet. Urbana, IL: University of Illinois Press. ISBN 0252023994.
  - Biography of the life of the youngest son of Joseph and Emma Smith, David Hyrum Smith.
- Launius, Roger D. (1 September 1995) [1988]. Joseph Smith III: Pragmatic Prophet. Urbana, IL: University of Illinois Press. ISBN 0252065158.
  - Biography of the founder of the RLDS Church, Joseph Smith III, which he led from 1860 until his death in 1914.
- Kimball, Edward L. (2005). Lengthen Your Stride: The Presidency of Spencer W. Kimball. Deseret Book. ISBN 1590384571.
  - Biography of Spencer W. Kimball, the 12th President of the LDS Church (from 1973 to 1985), written by his son; focused exclusively on Kimball's ministry at Church President.
- Fox, Frank W. (1980). J. Reuben Clark: The Public Years. Brigham Young University Press. ISBN 0842518320.
  - Biography of J. Reuben Clark; focused on his time as an attorney and government servant, prior to being called as a Counselor in the First Presidency (from 1933 to 1961).
- Madsen, Susan Arrington; Jones, Emily Madsen; Thornton, Rebecca Madsen (2018). Fathers of the Prophets: From Joseph Smith to Russell M. Nelson. Salt Lake City, Utah: Deseret Book. ISBN 978-1629724485.
  - Collective biography of fathers of the leaders of the LDS Church; including Joseph Smith Sr., John Young, James Taylor, Aphek Woodruff, Oliver Snow III, Hyrum Smith, Jedediah Morgan Grant, John Henry Smith, David McKay, Joseph F. Smith, Samuel Marion Lee Jr., Andrew Kimball, George Taft Benson Jr., John William "Will" Hunter, Bryant S. Hinckley, and George Spencer Monson.
- Quinn, D. Michael (2002). Elder Statesman: A Biography of J. Reuben Clark. Signature Books. ISBN 1560851554.
  - J. Reuben Clark's life and impact (intellectual and administrative) as counselor to three LDS Church presidents.
- Gibbons, Francis M. (14 January 2018). Daniel Bay, Gibbons (ed.). Russell M. Nelson. Sixteen Stones Press. ISBN 978-1942640257.
  - Biography of Russell M. Nelson, the seventeenth President of the LDS Church; a collection of personal reminiscences, written by a former secretary to the First Presidency, drawing on more than sixty years of association with President Nelson; the eighth and final part of the series entitled Remembering the Prophets of God.

== Personal accounts ==
- Jones, Daniel W. (1890). Forty Years Among the Indians: A True yet Thrilling Narrative of the Author's Experiences among the Natives. Juvenile Instructor Press. ISBN 1331575311.
  - Autobiography of a convert to the LDS Church, who participated in the rescue of handcart companies during the winter of 1856, worked with the Native American and Mexican peoples, and was an early settler of what became Mesa, Arizona.
- Hartley, William G. (1 December 1993). My Best for the Kingdom: History and Autobiography of John Lowe Butler, a Mormon Frontiersman. Salt Lake City: Aspen Books. ISBN 1562362127.
  - Account of John Lowe Butler, an early convert from Kentucky; bodyguard to Joseph Smith, Danite in the Missouri conflict, missionary to the Sioux, Nauvoo polygamist and Legionnaire, frontiersman and bishop of Spanish Fork during the Mormon Reformation and the Utah War.
- Hartley, William G.; Alder, Lorna Call (2007). Johnson, H. Lane (ed.). Anson Bowen Call: Bishop of Colonia Dublán. Provo, Utah: L.C. Alder. ISBN 978-1928845522.
  - Biography of Anson Bowen Call (1863–1958); bishop of Colonia Dublán, a Mormon colony in Chihuahua, Mexico.
- Lorelei (16 March 2016). From Mormon To Mermaid: One Woman's Voyage from Oppression to Freedom. DogEar Publishing. ISBN 978-1457542930.
  - Personal story of a woman, raised LDS, who leaves the Church after discovering doctrinal problems.
- Pearson, Carol Lynn (2006). Goodbye, I Love You. Cedar Fort. ISBN 1555179843.
  - A memoir of a LDS woman's marriage to a gay man who died of AIDS in 1984.
- Shipps, Jan (19 December 2000). Sojourner in the Promised Land: Forty Years Among the Mormons. University of Illinois Press. ISBN 0252025903.
  - An assemblage of writings about the Latter-day Saints by a preeminent non-Mormon interpreter of Mormonism; combination of a portrait of the evolution of contemporary Mormonism (from a provincial to a universal belief system), with an intellectual autobiography of her personal encounters.
- Brooks, Joanna (2012). The Book of Mormon Girl: A Memoir of an American Faith. Simon & Schuster. ISBN 978-1451699685.
  - Memoir of growing up in a devoutly LDS home; growing older and coming to wrestle with some tenets of the Church (including its stance on women's rights and homosexuality).

== See also ==
- List of Latter Day Saint periodicals
