= Perego =

Perego may refer to:

== People ==
Notable people with this surname include:

- Didi Perego, Italian actress
- Ettore Perego, Italian gymnast
- Eugenio Perego, Italian film director
- Federico Perego, Italian basketball assistant coach
- Gaetano Perego, Italian painter
- Giuseppe Perego, Italian comic artist
- Jeanne Perego, Italian writer and journalist
- Maria Perego, Italian animation artist
- Mark Perego, Welsh rugby player
- Paola Perego, Italian television host
- Ugo A. Perego, Italian geneticist

== Places ==
- Perego, Lecco, Italy

== Other ==
- Peg Perego, Italian manufacturer of juvenile products
