= Spencer J. Palmer =

American Mormon academic (1927–2000)

Spencer Palmer
- Born: Spencer John Palmer; October 4, 1927; Eden, Arizona, U.S.
- Died: November 27, 2000 (aged 73); Provo, Utah, U.S.
- Spouse: Shirley Ann Hadley (m. 1957)
- Children: 4

Academic background
- Education: Brigham Young University (BA); University of California, Berkeley (MA, PhD)

Academic work
- Discipline: History; Asian studies
- Sub-discipline: Asian history East Asian studies

Spencer John Palmer (October 4, 1927 – November 27, 2000) was a chronicler of the development of the Church of Jesus Christ of Latter-day Saints (LDS Church) in Asia as well as a major player in these developments. He was a historian of Korea, a scholar of comparative world religions, and wrote many books on these and related topics. He was a key figure in the second generation of Korean studies scholars in the United States.

== Early life and education ==
Palmer was born in Eden, Arizona, and raised in Thatcher. He studied at Eastern Arizona College before transferring to Brigham Young University (BYU) where he received his bachelor's degree. Between his studies at these two institutions Palmer served as a missionary for the LDS Church in the California Mission. He then studied at the University of California, Berkeley, where he earned a master's degree in East Asiatic studies and a Ph.D. in Oriental history.

== Career ==
Palmer served in the United States Army as a chaplain in both Japan and Korea. Palmer first arrived in Korea in 1953 as a 2nd lieutenant and chaplain.

When Palmer joined the BYU faculty he was the only scholar specializing in Korean studies. He was involved in forming BYU's Asian Studies program.

He was the president of the Korean Mission of the Church of Jesus Christ of Latter-day Saints from 1965 to 1968. During this time he often traveled and worked closely with Gordon B. Hinckley, who was then the member of the Quorum of the Twelve Apostles, responsible for overseeing the operation of the LDS Church in Asia. As mission president Palmer also purchased the site where the Church later built the Seoul Temple. Palmer served as a bishop, a counselor in a stake presidency, as a Regional Representative of the Twelve in Southeast Asia, and was president of the Seoul Korea Temple from 1988 to 1990.

For many years Palmer was a professor at BYU, where he served as director of the World Religions Division at BYU's Religious Studies Center and director of BYU's Center for International and Area Studies. This was the predecessor to the David M. Kennedy Center for International Studies at which Palmer served as a director.

In 1991 Palmer donated his collection of over 5,000 books on Asian and religious topics to BYU's Harold B. Lee Library, a collection that included about 1,500 rare books in Korean. In 1993 Palmer worked for six months as a visiting professor in China teaching comparative world religions to students from local ethnic minority groups at the invitation of the Chinese government.

== Personal life ==
In 1956, Palmer married Shirley Ann Hadley in the Salt Lake Temple. The Palmers were the parents of four children: John, Dwight, Jennette, and James. John Leroy Palmer, which was also the name of Palmer's father, died as an infant, but the other three outlived their father. Palmer died in Provo, Utah, in 2000. Spencer Palmer has been accused of sexual abuse by his grandson.

== Publications ==
- The Expanding Church. Salt Lake City: Deseret Book, 1978.
- The Church Encounters Asia. Salt Lake City: Deseret Book, 1970.
- Religions of the World: A Latter-day Saint View (with James A. Toronto, Dong Sull Choi, and Roger R. Keller)
- The Korean Saints, Personal Stories of Trial and triumph, 1950-1980. This book is a compilation of the stories of many people. Palmer's wife Shirley was a co-compiler of this book.
- Mormons and Muslims: Spiritual Foundations and Modern Manifestations Provo: BYU Religious Studies Center, 1983.
- Confucian Rituals in Korea
- Korea and Christianity, The Problem of Identification with Tradition
- New Religions of Korea

== Sources ==
- about the author info on The Expanding Church.
- Sheri Dew. Go Forward With Faith: The Biography of Gordon B. Hinckley. (Salt Lake City: Deseret Book, 1996) p. 287, 350, 437.
- Short bio introducing Palmer's remarks on a common ground between Latter-day Saints and Muslims
