= Black and Mormon =

Book by Newell G. Bringhurst and Darron T. Smith

- Author: Newell G. Bringhurst; Darron T. Smith
- Language: English
- Subject: Black people and Mormonism; Black people and priesthood (LDS); Black Mormons
- Publisher: University of Illinois Press
- Publication date: 2004
- Publication place: United States
- Pages: 184
- ISBN: 0-252-02947-X

Black and Mormon is a 2004 book edited, with an introduction, by Newell G. Bringhurst and Darron T. Smith. It is a collection of articles about Black people and Mormonism, race and the LDS priesthood, and the experience of Black Mormons.

The editors claim the Church "needs to forthrightly confront its past history of racial exclusion and discrimination."

== Contents ==
1. "The "Missouri Thesis" Revisited: Early Mormonism, Slavery, and the Status of Black People" by Newell G. Bringhurst
2. "The Traditions of Their Fathers: Myth versus Reality in LDS Scriptural Writings" by Alma Allred
3. "Two Perspectives: The Religious Hopes of "Worthy" African American Latter-day Saints before the 1978 Revelation" by Ronald G. Coleman and Darius A. Gray
4. "Spanning the Priesthood Revelation (1978): Two Multigenerational Case Studies" by Jessie L. Embry
5. "Casting Off the "Curse of Cain": The Extent and Limits of Progress since 1978" by Armand L. Mauss
6. "African American Latter-day Saints: A Sociological Perspective" by Cardell K. Jacobson
7. ""How Do Things Look on the Ground?" The LDS African American Community in Atlanta, Georgia" by Ken Driggs
8. "Unpacking Whiteness in Zion: Some Personal Reflections and General Observations" by Darron T. Smith

== Response ==
Publishers Weekly called it "one of the most far-reaching studies of black Mormons to date."
