= Lester E. Bush Jr. =

Researcher of Mormonism's "Negro doctrine"

Lester Earl Bush Jr.
- Born: November 22, 1942; Atlanta, Georgia, U.S.
- Died: November 23, 2023 (aged 81); California, U.S.
- Education: University of Virginia (Undergraduate and Medical degrees); Johns Hopkins University (Master's in Public Health)
- Occupations: Historian, Physician
- Known for: Research into the origins of the "Negro doctrine" in the LDS Church
- Spouse: Yvonne DeCarroll Snow (m. 1967)
- Awards: Best article (1973) by the Mormon History Associated for "Mormonism's Negro Doctrine: An Historical Overview"

Lester Earl Bush Jr. (November 22, 1942 – November 23, 2023) was a historian and member of the Church of Jesus Christ of Latter-Day Saints (LDS Church) who published influential research into the origins of the "Negro doctrine," a now-abandoned church policy which excluded African-Americans from membership in the church's priesthood and from participation in a number of other church practices. He also published historical research into other topics, including a medical history of Brigham Young and reviews of LDS health and medical practices.

Bush was born on November 22, 1942, in Atlanta, Georgia. He married Yvonne DeCarroll Snow on August 24, 1967. He was a physician with undergraduate and medical degrees from the University of Virginia, a master's in public health from Johns Hopkins University, and a long-standing interest in Mormon history.

== Mormonism's Negro Doctrine: An Historical Overview ==
In 1973, Bush's article "Mormonism's Negro Doctrine: An Historical Overview" was published in Dialogue: A Journal of Mormon Thought, receiving the best article award from The Mormon History Association in the same year. His research found that the priesthood ban was originally established by Brigham Young, the successor to church founder Joseph Smith and that there was no evidence of a prophetic revelation or doctrine which had caused the policy to be adopted. The end of the ban was announced on June 8, 1978 as a "revelation" received by Spencer W. Kimball, the president of the church, and canonized as Official Declaration 2. According to his son, Edward L. Kimball, LDS apostle Mark E. Peterson "almost surely" recommended to Spencer Kimball on May 25 that he should consider Bush's article while Kimball was deliberating whether to change the church policy.

The end of the "Negro doctrine" was the "most exciting single event of the years I was church historian," recalled official LDS historian Leonard J. Arrington. "I was thrilled and electrified. ... For many days I talked with a host of friends and relatives on the telephone and in person. Everyone was elated -- and sobered." However, neither Arrington nor any other official church historians had researched or written about the background of the ban prior to the revelation. According to Chad L. Nielsen, Bush's article in Dialogue was "the single most important article on the history of the priesthood ban. ... Bush demonstrated the ability scholars have to create a paradigm shift among the Mormon community. ... Bush radically revised what was understood about the origins of the priesthood ban." According to Darius Gray, co-founder of the Genesis Group, a grassroots organization for Black Latter-day Saints, "No other single individual had a greater effect on addressing the past policy of restricting those of African descent from the priesthood and temple attendance."

According to the Juvenile Instructor, an academically leaning blog focused on the history of the Latter-day Saints, "Mormonism's Negro Doctrine" was "a master work of scholarship that not only revolutionized how historians, sociologists, and other academics view the church’s history of race relations, but was also a significant factor leading to Official Declaration 2," which ended the Negro priesthood ban.

== Other works ==
- Lester E. Bush Jr. and Armand L. Mauss, eds., Neither White nor Black: Mormon Scholars Confront the Race Issue in a Universal Church, Signature Books, 1984.
- Bush, Lester E. Jr. (1978), "Brigham Young in Life and Death: A Medical Overview", Journal of Mormon History, 5: 79–103, JSTOR 23286038
- Bush, Lester E. Jr. (Summer 1985), "Ethical Issues in Reproductive Medicine: A Mormon Perspective", Dialogue: A Journal of Mormon Thought, 18: 41–66, doi:10.2307/45227959, JSTOR 45227959
- Bush, Lester E. Jr. (Spring 1999), "Writing "Mormonism's Negro Doctrine: An Historical Overview" (1973): Context and Reflections, 1998", Journal of Mormon History, 25 (1): 229–271, JSTOR 23287744
- Bush, Lester E. Jr. (October 1, 2018), "Looking Back, Looking Forward: "Mormonism's Negro Doctrine" Forty-Five Years Later", Dialogue: A Journal of Mormon Thought, 51 (3): 1–28, doi:10.5406/dialjmormthou.51.3.0001
