= Eric R. Dursteler =

American historian

- Born: 1964 (age 61–62)
- Occupations: Historian, author
- Known for: Author of Mediterranean and Venetian history
- Spouse: Whitney Campbell Dursteler
- Children: 3

Academic background
- Education: MA, PhD
- Alma mater: Brigham Young University; Brown University

Eric R. Dursteler (born 1964) is the De Lamar Jensen Professor of early modern History at Brigham Young University (BYU), where he has worked since 1998. He is also former chair of the BYU history department. He specializes in the history of early modern Italy, the early modern Mediterranean, the history of food, gender and language. He has authored numerous scholarly books, journal articles and book chapters on a wide range of topics related to early modern Mediterranean and Venetian history.

== Education and personal life ==
Dursteler was born in Logan, Utah in 1964. He is a member of the Church of Jesus Christ of Latter-day Saints, and served as a church missionary in the Italy Milan Mission from 1983 to 1985. He served as the bishop of an LDS Young Single Adult ward from 2014 to 2017.

Dursteler holds both a BA and MA degree from BYU, and an MA and PhD from Brown University. He completed his PhD in 2000; Anthony Molho was his dissertation advisor.

He resides with his wife, Whitney Dursteler (Campbell), in Provo, UT, and has three adult children.

== Academic and professional career ==
Dursteler has been a faculty member of the BYU department of history since 1998, and served as chair of the BYU history department from 2016 to 2019. He has held a Fulbright Fellowship, a National Endowment for the Humanities fellowship and a Villa I Tatti fellowship from the Harvard University Center for Italian Renaissance Studies (2006–2007). In 2020 he was awarded a Fernand Braudel Senior Fellowship at the European University Institute. In 2022 he was a research fellow at the Netherlands Institute for Advanced Study.

He is the editor for News on the Rialto, "an annual publication devoted to providing an informational point of reference for scholars working on all aspects of Venetian studies, including the political, economic, social, religious, artistic, architectural, musical and literary history of the city, its overseas empire, and its mainland territories." He was also formerly the book review editor for both the Journal of Early Modern History, and Mediterranean Studies. He serves on the International Editorial Advisory Board for the Journal of Mediterranean Studies. He is a member of the Founding Editorial Board for Oxford Bibliographies Renaissance and Reformation.

In February 2025 he was appointed Associate Dean of Undergraduate Education and Director of the Honors Program at BYU.

== Selected works ==
Dursteler has authored numerous books, book chapters, encyclopedic entries, journal articles and reviews, some of which include:

=== Books ===
- Dursteler, Eric R. (2006), Venetians in Constantinople: Nation, Identity and Coexistence in the Early Modern Mediterranean. Johns Hopkins University Press, ISBN 9780801891052
- Dursteler, Eric R. (2011), Renegade Women: Gender, Identity and Boundaries in the Early Modern Mediterranean. Johns Hopkins University Press, ISBN 9781421403489
- Dursteler, Eric R., editor (2013), A Companion to Venetian History, 1400-1797. Brill's Companions to European History, Volume 4, DOI: 10.1163/9789004252523
- Dursteler, Eric R.; O'Connell, Monique (2016), The Mediterranean World: From the Fall of Rome to the Rise of Napoleon. Johns Hopkins University Press, ISBN 9781421419015
- James A. Toronto, Eric R. Dursteler and Michael W. Homer (2017), Mormons in the Piazza: History of the Latter-day Saints in Italy. Provo and Salt Lake City: Brigham Young University Religious Studies Center in cooperation with Deseret Book. ISBN 978-1-9443-9410-3.
- Dursteler, Eric R., editor and translator (2018), In the Sultan’s Realm: Two Venetian Ambassadorial Reports on the Early Modern Ottoman Empire. Toronto: Centre for Reformation and Renaissance Studies, 2018. ISBN 978-0772721914

=== Articles ===
- “Language and Gender in the Early Modern Mediterranean,” Renaissance Quarterly 75 (2022): 1-45.
- “Fearing the ‘Turk’ and Feeling the Spirit: Emotion and Conversion in the early modern Mediterranean,” Journal of Religious History 38 (2015): 484-505.
- “Bad Bread and the ‘Outrageous Drunkenness of the Turks’: Food and Identity in the Accounts of early modern European Travelers to the Ottoman Empire,” Journal of World History 25 (2014): 203-228.
- “Speaking in Tongues: Multilingualism and Multicultural Communication in the Early Modern Mediterranean,” Past & Present 217 (2012): 47–77.
- “Inheriting the ‘Great Apostasy’: The Evolution of Mormon Views on the Middle Ages and the Renaissance,” Journal of Mormon History 28 (Fall 2002): 23-59.
- “The Bailo in Constantinople: Crisis and Career in Venice’s Early Modern Diplomatic Corps,” Mediterranean Historical Review 16 (2001): 1-25.

=== Book chapters ===
- "To Piety or Conversion More Prone? Gender and Conversion in the Early Modern Mediterranean"
- "Fleeing "The Vomit of Infidelity": Borders, Conversion and Muslim Women's Agency in the early modern Mediterranean"

== Awards ==
- 2022: Research Fellow, Netherlands Institute for Advanced Study, Netherlands
- 2020: Fernand Braudel Senior Fellowship, European University Institute, Italy
- 2006: Fellowship for Independent Study and Research, National Endowment for the Humanities, USA
- 2006: Committee to Rescue Italian Art Fellowship, Villa I Tatti: The Harvard University Center for Italian Renaissance Studies, Italy
- 1996: Fulbright Fellowship, Fulbright Commission, USA
