= Quincy D. Newell =

American historian (born 1976)

- Born: 1976 (age 49–50)
- Education: Amherst College; University of North Carolina at Chapel Hill (MA, PhD)
- Occupation: Religious studies scholar
- Employer: University of Wyoming
- Awards: American Society of Church History's 2018 Jane Dempsey Douglass Prize; 2017 Best Article in Mormon Women’s History prize (Mormon History Association)

Quincy D. Newell (born 1976) is an American historian of the nineteenth-century American West especially as it involves the religious experiences of racial and ethnic minorities. She is associate professor at Hamilton College, a member of the executive committee of the Mormon History Association, and co-editor of the journal Mormon Studies Review (2019– ) In 2015, Newell presented the 21st Leonard J. Arrington Lecture at the Utah State University: "Narrating Jane: Telling the story of an early African American Mormon woman."

== Books ==
- Constructing lives at Mission San Francisco: Native Californians and Hispanic colonists, 1776-1821 (University of New Mexico Press, 2009)
- New perspectives in Mormon studies: Creating and crossing boundaries (Eric F. Mason & Quincy D. Newell, eds.; University of Oklahoma Press, 2013)
- Your sister in the gospel: The life of Jane Manning James, a nineteenth-century black Mormon (Oxford University Press, 2019)
