= David M. Kennedy Center for International Studies =

Coordinates: 40°14′52″N 111°38′57″W

The David M. Kennedy Center for International Studies provides international study and service opportunities for students at Brigham Young University (BYU). The center was named after former Secretary of Treasury David Matthew Kennedy. The center is housed in the Herald R. Clark building and offers six interdisciplinary studies programs: Ancient Near East studies, Asian Studies, European Studies, International Relations, Latin American Studies, and Middle Eastern Studies/Arabic. The center also manages BYU’s study abroad programs. Since August 2021, the director for the center is V. Stanley Benfell following Renata Forste's appointment as BYU International Vice President.
