= Roger R. Keller =

Roger R. Keller (15 October 1939 – 29 September 2021) was a professor of religion at Brigham Young University (BYU). He was born in Massillon, Ohio. He retired in the summer of 2012.

Keller is a convert to the Church of Jesus Christ of Latter-day Saints (LDS Church) having been at times both a Presbyterian and a Methodist minister prior to joining the LDS Church.

Keller earned a Ph.D. in religion from Duke University in 1975. Keller served as a Russian linguist for U.S. military intelligence. Besides being a Presbyterian minister, he was also a chaplain at a Presbyterian College.

Keller was one of the co-editors with Spencer J. Palmer of The Gospel and World Religions. He also wrote Book of Mormon Authors: Their Words and Messages, and Light & Truth: A Latter-day Saint Guide to World Religions, his newest book, published in 2012.

Keller has served as a bishop in the LDS Church.

Keller has in the past been among the holders of BYU's Richard L. Evans Chair of Religious Understanding. Keller has a long tradition of promoting religious understanding and inter-faith good will; back when he was a Protestant pastor he was among those who spoke out against The God Makers.

Keller was also the director of BYU's program for the training of military chaplains.

== Sources ==
- BYU bio
