= Jennifer Finlayson-Fife =

American psychologist and sexuality educator

- Born: Vermont, United States
- Education: Brigham Young University, BS; Boston College, PhD
- Occupation: Psychologist

Jennifer Finlayson-Fife is an American psychologist, sexuality educator, and clinical professional counselor.

== Early life ==
Finlayson-Fife grew up in Vermont, obtained a bachelor's degree in psychology from Brigham Young University, and served a mission for the Church of Jesus Christ of Latter-day Saints (LDS Church). She received a Doctor of Philosophy in Counseling Psychology from Boston College. She wrote her doctoral dissertation on female sexuality in the LDS Church.

== Career ==
Finlayson-Fife professional work involves coaching and teaching members of the LDS Church overcome cultural and psychological barriers to intimate sexuality. She has written on the effects of pornography in marriage and has found that constant porn use undermines marriages. She has written on teachings of modesty in the LDS Church and writes, "The current discourse on modesty undermines women's relationship to themselves, to their sexuality, and to men." Finlayson-Fife has also written on the cultural norms related to men and women in the LDS Church and the different messages they hear about sex.

== Personal life ==
Finlayson-Fife is married with three children and lives in the Chicago, Illinois suburbs.
