= Newell G. Bringhurst =

American historian and author

- Born: 3 April 1942 (age 84); Salt Lake City, Utah
- Education: UC Davis, Ph.D.; University of Utah
- Occupations: Professor, author
- Years active: 1978–present
- Employer: College of the Sequoias

Newell G. Bringhurst (born 3 April 1942) is an American historian and author of books and essays. Most of his writings have been about Mormonism— particularly topics and figures of controversy, such as Black people and temple and priesthood policies, Fawn Brodie, polygamy, and schisms within the LDS movement.

Bringhurst taught history and political science for 35 years at the College of the Sequoias in Visalia, California, and is now a professor emeritus.

== Biography ==
Bringhurst was born in Salt Lake City, Utah. He received a B.S. degree from the University of Utah in 1965, and completed his master's degree studies in 1967 with a thesis on George H. Dern.

Bringhurst became a history department lecturer at San Jose State University in 1972, where he taught for three years. He was awarded a Ph.D. in history from the University of California at Davis in 1975. He was hired the following year by Boise State University as an instructor of history. He joined the faculty at Indiana University at Kokomo as an assistant professor of history in 1977.

Bringhurst joined the Mormon History Association in 1972, and served as its president in 1999–2000. He was appointed as MHA Historian in 2002. He has been involved with The John Whitmer Historical Association since the mid-1970s, and served as its president from 2005 to 2006.

=== Personal life ===
Bringhurst has been married since the mid-1970s, and has one daughter. He has expressed an enjoyment for hiking and other outdoor activities.

Bringhurst has been described as a "cultural Mormon and a liberal Democrat".

== Accolades ==
In 2005, the John Whitmer Historical Association's Special Book Award was granted to Bringhurst and his co-editor Lavina Fielding Anderson for Excavating Mormon Pasts: The New Historiography of the Last Half Century.

In 2021, Bringhurst received the Leonard J. Arrington Lifetime Contribution Award from the Mormon History Association.

== Publication ==
=== Books ===
- Bringhurst, Newell G. (1981). Saints, Slaves, and Blacks: The Changing Place of Black People Within Mormonism. Westport, Conn.: Greenwood Publishing Group. ISBN 0-313-22752-7. "Book 4 of the Contributions to the Study of Religion Series"
- Bringhurst, Newell G. (1986). Handlin, Oscar (ed.). Brigham Young And The Expanding American Frontier. Boston: Little, Brown. ISBN 0-316-10822-7. "Library of American Biography Series". Republished on 24 January 1997 by Longman. ISBN 0-673-39322-4.
- Bringhurst, Newell G., ed. (1 August 1996). Reconsidering No Man Knows My History: Fawn M. Brodie and Joseph Smith in Retrospect. Logan, Utah: Utah State University Press. ISBN 0-874-21214-6.
- Bringhurst, Newell G. (1999). Fawn McKay Brodie: A Biographer's Life. Norman: University of Oklahoma Press. ISBN 0-806-13181-0.
- Bringhurst, Newell G.; Mitchell, Annie R. (foreword) (2000). Visalia's Fabulous Fox: A Theatre Story. Visalia, CA: Jostens Printing and Publishing. ISBN 0-967-54820-9. "A history of the Visalia Fox theater (1928-2000)"
- Bringhurst, Newell G.; Anderson, Lavina Fielding, eds. (31 May 2004). Excavating Mormon Pasts: The New Historiography of the Last Half Century. Salt Lake City: Greg Kofford Books. ISBN 1-589-58091-5.
- Bringhurst, Newell G.; Smith, Darron T., eds. (2004). Black and Mormon. Urbana: University of Illinois Press. ISBN 0-252-02947-X.
- Bringhurst, Newell G.; Hamer, John C., eds. (10 September 2007). Scattering Of The Saints: Schism Within Mormonism. Independence, Missouri: John Whitmer Books. ISBN 978-1-934-90102-1.
- Bringhurst, Newell G.; Foster, Craig L. (1 January 2008). The Mormon Quest for the Presidency: From Joseph Smith to Mitt Romney and Jon Huntsman. Independence, MO: John Whitmer Books. ISBN 978-1-934-90111-3. Expanded and updated volume released on 11 September 2011. ISBN 1-934-90109-1.
- Bringhurst, Newell G.; Foster, Craig L., eds. (1 November 2010). The Persistence of Polygamy: Joseph Smith and the Origins of Mormon Polygamy. Independence, Missouri: John Whitmer Books. ISBN 978-1-934-90113-7.
- Bringhurst, Newell G.; Foster, Craig L., eds. (23 September 2013). The Persistence of Polygamy, Vol. 2: From Joseph Smith's Martyrdom to the First Manifesto, 1844-1890. Independence, Missouri: John Whitmer Books. ISBN 978-1-934-90114-4.
- Bringhurst, Newell G.; Foster, Craig L., eds. (11 September 2015). The Persistence of Polygamy, Vol. 3: Fundamentalist Mormon Polygamy from 1890 to the Present. Independence, Missouri: John Whitmer Books. ISBN 978-1-934-90119-9.
- Harris, Matthew L.; Bringhurst, Newell G., eds. (4 November 2015). The Mormon Church and Blacks: A Documentary History. University of Illinois Press. ISBN 978-0-252-08121-7.

=== Essays and articles ===
- Bringhurst, Newell G. (Winter 1978). "An Ambiguous Decision: The Implementation of Mormon Priesthood Denial for the Black Man—A Re-Examination". Utah Historical Quarterly. 46 (46): 45–64. doi:10.2307/45060571. JSTOR 45060571. S2CID 254431257.
- Bringhurst, Newell G. (Summer 1979). "Elijah Abel and the Changing Status of Blacks Within Mormonism" (PDF). Dialogue: A Journal of Mormon Thought. 12 (2): 22–36. doi:10.2307/45224769. JSTOR 45224769. S2CID 254387560. Republished in Bush Jr., Lester E.; Mauss, Armand L., eds. (1984). Neither White nor Black: Mormon Scholars Confront the Race Issue in a Universal Church. Midvale, Utah: Signature Books. ISBN 0-941-21422-2
- Bringhurst, Newell G. (May–June 1981). "Mormonism in Black Africa: Changing Attitudes and Practices 1830-1981" (PDF). Sunstone Magazine. 6 (3): 15–21.
- Bringhurst, Newell. G. (Winter 1991–1992). "Fawn Brodie's Richard Nixon: The Making of a Controversial Biography". California History. 70 (4). University of California Press in association with the California Historical Society: 378–391. doi:10.2307/25158591. JSTOR 25158591.
- Bringhurst, Newell G. (April 1992). "Thomas Kearns: Irish-American Builder of Modern Utah". Journal of the West. 31 (2): 24–32.
- Bringhurst, Newell G. (1994). "Joseph Smith, the Mormons, And Antebellum Reform—A Closer Look" (PDF). The John Whitmer Historical Association Journal. 14. John Whitmer Historical Association: 73–91. Also included in The Prophet Puzzle: Interpretive Essays on Joseph Smith edited by Bryan Waterman (15 February 1999). Signature Books. ISBN 1-560-85121-X.
- Bringhurst, Newell G. (Summer 1994). "Juanita Brooks and Fawn Brodie — Sisters in Mormon Dissent" (PDF). Dialogue: A Journal of Mormon Thought. 27 (2): 105–127. doi:10.2307/45228821. JSTOR 45228821. S2CID 254329464.
- Bringhurst, Newell G. (Fall 1998). "The Private Versus Public David O. McKay: Profile of a Complex Personality" (PDF). Dialogue: A Journal of Mormon Thought. 31 (3): 11–34. doi:10.2307/45228408. JSTOR 45228408. S2CID 254316374. Republished in Taysom, Stephen C., ed. (15 June 2011) Dimensions of Faith: A Mormon Studies Reader. Salt Lake City: Signature Books. ISBN 1-560-85212-7.
- Bringhurst, Newell G. (Winter 2000). "The Ku Klux Klan in a Central California Community: Tulare County During the 1920s and 1930s". Southern California Quarterly. 82 (4). University of California Press on behalf of the Historical Society of Southern California: 365–396. doi:10.2307/41172036. JSTOR 41172036.
- Bringhurst, Newell G. (Fall 2002). "My 'Affair' with Fawn McKay Brodie: Motives, Pain, and Pleasure" (PDF). Dialogue: A Journal of Mormon Thought. 35 (3): 200–211.
- Sillito, John R.; Staker, Susan, eds. (2002). Mormon Mavericks: Essays on Dissenters. "Fawn McKay Brodie and Her Quest for Independence" by Newell G. Bringhurst. Salt Lake City, Utah: Signature Books. ISBN 1-560-85154-6.
