= Catherine Brekus =

American historian

Academic background
- Education: Harvard University; Yale University
- Thesis: Let Your Women Keep Silence in the Churches (1993)

Academic work
- Discipline: History
- Sub-discipline: American religious history
- Institutions: University of Chicago; Harvard University
- Notable works: Strangers and Pilgrims (1998); Sarah Osborn's World (2013)

Catherine Anne Brekus is Charles Warren Professor of the History of Religion in America at Harvard Divinity School. Brekus' work is centered on American religious history, especially the religious history of women, focusing on the evangelical Protestant tradition.

Brekus received a Bachelor of Arts degree in history and literature from Harvard University in 1985, having submitted the honors thesis Women in the Chartist Movement: Historical and Literary Images. She received a Doctor of Philosophy degree in American studies from Yale University with the dissertation "Let Your Women Keep Silence in the Churches": Female Preaching and Evangelical Religion in America, 1740–1845.

Brekus' works have included a history of female preaching in America entitled Strangers and Pilgrims: Female Preaching in America, 1740–1845 (1998) and a history of early evangelicalism based on a woman's diaries entitled Sarah Osborn's World: The Rise of Evangelical Christianity in Early America (2013). She has also edited volumes on The Religious History of American Women: Reimagining the Past (2007) and, with W. Clark Gilpin, American Christianities: A History of Dominance and Diversity (2011). She has been involved in efforts to reprise women's role within American religious history, organizing the first conference on the topic in the United States in 2003.

== Published works ==
=== Books ===
- Strangers and Pilgrims: Female Preaching in America, 1740–1845. Chapel Hill, North Carolina: University of North Carolina Press. 1998. ISBN 978-0-8078-2441-2.
- The Religious History of American Women: Reimagining the Past. Editor. Chapel Hill, North Carolina: University of North Carolina Press. 2007. doi:10.5149/9780807867990_brekus. ISBN 978-0-8078-5800-4.
- American Christianities: A History of Dominance and Diversity. Edited with Gilpin, W. Clark. Chapel Hill, North Carolina: University of North Carolina Press. 2011. ISBN 978-0-8078-3515-9.
- Sarah Osborn's World: The Rise of Evangelical Christianity in Early America. New Haven, Connecticut: Yale University Press. 2013. ISBN 978-0-300-18290-3.
- Sarah Osborn's Collected Writings. Editor. By Osborn, Sarah. New Haven, Connecticut: Yale University Press. 2017. ISBN 978-0-300-18289-7.

=== Book chapters ===
- "Restoring the Divine Order to the World: Religion and the Family in the Antebellum Woman's Rights Movement". In Carr, Anne; Van Leeuwen, Mary Stewart. Religion, Feminism, and the Family. Louisville, Kentucky: Westminster John Knox Press. 1996. pp. 166–182. ISBN 978-0-664-25512-1.
- "The Revolution in the Churches: Women's Religious Activism in the Early American Republic". In Hutson, James H. Religion and the New Republic: Faith in the Founding of America. Lanham, Maryland: Rowman & Littlefield Publishers. 2000. pp. 115–136. ISBN 978-0-8476-9434-1.
- "Children of Wrath, Children of Grace: Jonathan Edwards and the Puritan Culture of Child Rearing". In Bunge, Marcia J. The Child in Christian Thought. Grand Rapids, Michigan: Wm. B. Eerdmans Publishing Company. 2001. pp. 300–328. ISBN 978-0-8028-4693-8.
- "Female Evangelism in the Early Methodist Movement, 1784–1845". In Hatch, Nathan O.; Wigger, John H. Methodism and the Shaping of American Culture. Nashville, Tennessee: Kingswood Books. 2001. pp. 135ff. ISBN 978-0-687-04854-0.
- "Interpreting American Religion". In Barney, William L. A Companion to 19th-Century America. Malden, Massachusetts: Blackwell Publishing. 2001. pp. 317–333. doi:10.1002/9780470998472.ch23. ISBN 978-0-631-20985-0.
- "Remembering Jonathan Edwards's Ministry to Children". In Kling, David W.; Sweeney, Douglas A. Jonathan Edwards at Home and Abroad: Historical Memories, Cultural Movements, Global Horizons. Columbia, South Carolina: University of South Carolina Press. 2003. pp. 40ff. ISBN 978-1-57003-519-7.
- "Sarah Osborn's World: Popular Christianity in Eighteenth-Century America". In Wilkins, Christopher I. The Papers of the Henry Luce III Fellows in Theology. 6. Pittsburgh, Pennsylvania: Association of Theological Schools in the United States and Canada. 2003. ISBN 978-0-9702346-2-9.
- "Protestant Female Preaching in the United States". In Keller, Rosemary Skinner; Ruether, Rosemary Radford. Encyclopedia of Women and Religion in North America. 2. Bloomington, Indiana: Indiana University Press. 2006. ISBN 978-0-253-34687-2.
- "Introduction: Searching for Women in Narratives of American Religious History". In Brekus, Catherine A. The Religious History of American Women: Reimagining the Past. Chapel Hill, North Carolina: University of North Carolina Press. 2007. pp. 1–50. doi:10.5149/9780807867990_brekus. ISBN 978-0-8078-5800-4.
- "Sarah Osborn's Enlightenment: Reimagining Eighteenth-Century Intellectual History". In Brekus, Catherine A. The Religious History of American Women: Reimagining the Past. Chapel Hill, North Carolina: University of North Carolina Press. 2007. pp. 108–141. doi:10.5149/9780807867990_brekus. ISBN 978-0-8078-5800-4.
- "Women and Religion in Colonial North America and the United States". Oxford Research Encyclopedia of American History. Vol. 1. Oxford: Oxford University Press. 2017. doi:10.1093/acrefore/9780199329175.013.35. ISBN 978-0-19-932917-5.

=== Journal articles ===
- "The Flag and the Cross". The Journal of the Historical Society. 3 (2): 177–183. 2003. doi:10.1111/1540-5923.00054. ISSN 1540-5923.
- "Interchange: History in the Professional Schools". With Baughman, James L.; Dudziak, Mary L.; Koehn, Nancy F.; Lederer, Susan E.; Zimmerman, Jonathan. The Journal of American History. 92 (2): 553–576. 2005. doi:10.2307/3659278. ISSN 0021-8723.
- "Harriet Livermore, the Pilgrim Stranger: Female Preaching and Biblical Feminism in Early-Nineteenth-Century America". Church History. 65 (3): 389–404. 2006. doi:10.2307/3169937. ISSN 0009-6407. JSTOR 3169937. S2CID 161605732.
- "Mormon Women and the Problem of Historical Agency". Journal of Mormon History. 37 (2): 59–87. 2011. doi:10.2307/23291637. ISSN 0094-7342. JSTOR 23291637. S2CID 254489965.
- "Writing Religious Experience: Women's Authorship in Early America". The Journal of Religion. 92 (4): 482–497. 2012. doi:10.1086/666834. ISSN 1549-6538. S2CID 170553136.
- "Religion and the Biographical Turn". With Schmidt, Leigh Eric; Salvatore, Nick; Sutton, Matthew Avery; Applegate, Debby. Forum. Religion and American Culture. 24 (1): 1–35. 2014. doi:10.1525/rac.2014.24.1.1. ISSN 1533-8568 JSTOR 10.1525/rac.2014.24.1.1.
- "Who Makes History? American Religious Historians and the Problem of Historical Agency". Fides et Historia. 47 (2): 93–100. 2015. ISSN 0884-5379.
- "The Work We Have to Do: Mark Noll's Contributions to Writing the History of American Christianity". Fides et Historia. 48 (2): 23–28. 2016. ISSN 0884-5379.

=== Other periodical articles ===
- "Female Preaching in Early Nineteenth-Century America" (PDF). Christian Reflection: A Series in Faith and Ethics. 33: 20–29. 2009. ISSN 1535-8585.

== See also ==
- History of women in the United States
- Protestantism in the United States
- Women and religion
- Women in Christianity
