= Rose Marie Reid =

American fashion designer

- Born: September 12, 1906; Cardston, Alberta, Canada
- Died: December 16, 1978 (aged 72); Provo, Utah, United States
- Occupation: Swimsuit Designer
- Spouses: Gareth Rhynhart; Jack Crossman Reid
- Children: 3

Rose Marie Reid, born Rose Marie Yancey (September 12, 1906, in Cardston, Alberta, Canada – December 16, 1978, in Provo, Utah, United States), was a successful Canadian-born American swimsuit designer from the 1940s–60s.

== Family ==
Rose Marie Yancey was born to William Elvie Yancey Sr. and Marie Hyde Yancey on September 12, 1906, in Cardston, Alberta, Canada. Her mother taught her to sew. In 1916, her family moved to a farm in Weiser, Idaho. In 1925, she purchased a beauty salon in Oregon. Shortly after, she married Gareth Rhynhart, a traveling artist. They divorced in 1935.

Reid moved to Vancouver, British Columbia, following her divorce. Reid married Jack Crossman Reid on November 30, 1935. She had three children with him, Bruce Alan Reid (1937–2015), Sharon Reid Alden (b. 1938), and Carole Marie Reid Burr (1940–2020). Due to infidelity and abuse, Reid divorced Jack on April 10, 1946. The divorce helped precipitate her large business move to California in 1949.

== Career ==
=== Early career in Canada ===
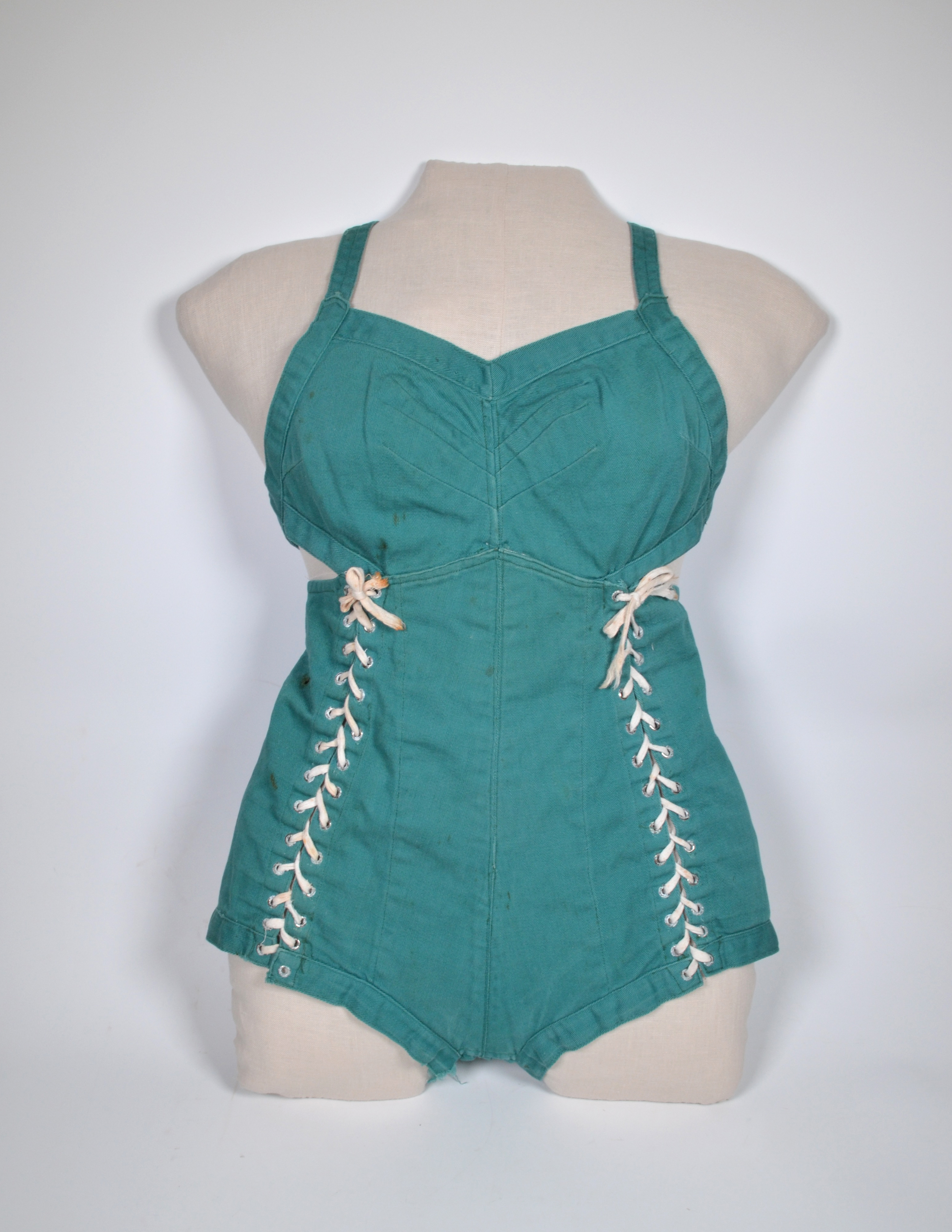
Early Lace-up Suit

Reid began her swimsuit designing career in Vancouver, British Columbia, Canada. She was inspired to design swimsuits because her husband, Jack, complained about the material and comfort of his swimwear. Her design business began in 1936 with Reid's Holiday Togs, Ltd. Lacing up both sides was typical of her earliest swimsuits and a 1938 example is preserved at the New Westminster Museum and Archives in Canada (Artifact # IH 994.76.68). In her first year of business, Reid employed 16 employees, grossed $10,000, and designed only six suits.

=== Rose Marie Reid, Inc. ===
On September 20, 1946, Reid launched her American business, Rose Marie Reid, Inc. However, she still maintained her Canadian business. By 1946, 50% of the swimsuits sold in Canada were her designs. Her swimsuits dominated the American market and were popular in western Europe, South America, and Australia. After starting her American business, Reid lived in her Los Angeles factory until she purchased a home in Brentwood, California, in 1949.

Reid was known for innovative and fashionable swimsuit designs and production. She was the first swimsuit designer to use inner brassieres, tummy-tuck panels, stay-down legs, elastic banding, brief skirts, and foundation garments in swimwear. She was also the first designer to introduce dress sizes in swimwear, designing swimwear for multiple sizes and types of bodies, rather than just producing one standard size. Reid filed for a U.S. patent in 1950 for a one-piece bathing suit using elastic fabric that lacked buttons. Her company patented a machine for a fagotting stitch that became a hallmark of her designs. She had several other patents for swimsuits and accessories.

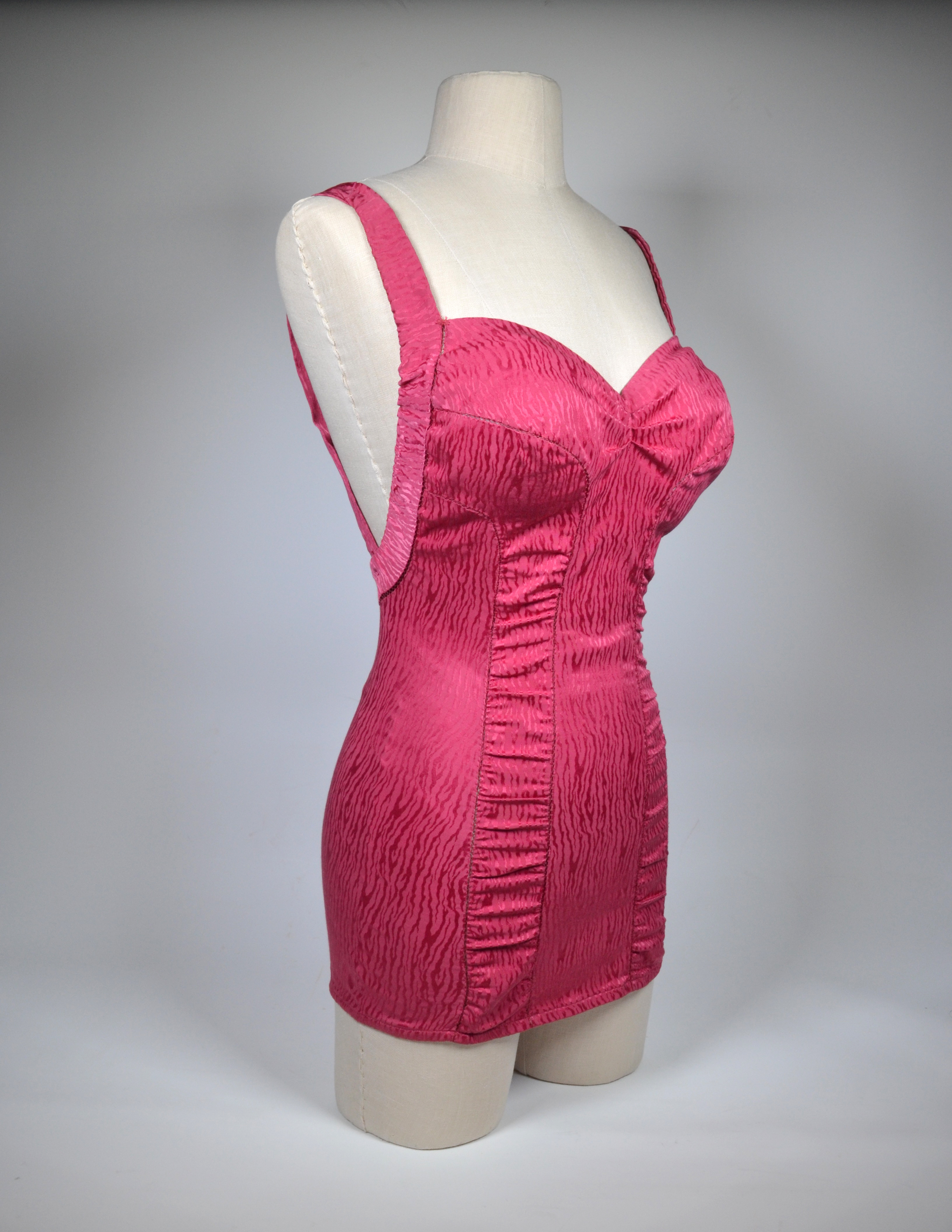
Shirred Panel Classic Swimsuit

Among her designs was the "Hourglass" suit, introduced in 1951 which was produced in many variations. It went on to become one of her company's all-time best sellers. Her "Magic Length" swimsuit line featured an inner "miracle bra", tuck-away straps, a tummy control panel, stay-down leg, and elasticized back to keep the bodice from gapping. With its numerous adaptations for different body types, the "Magic Length" became a Rose Marie Reid classic and remained popular through the 1950s.

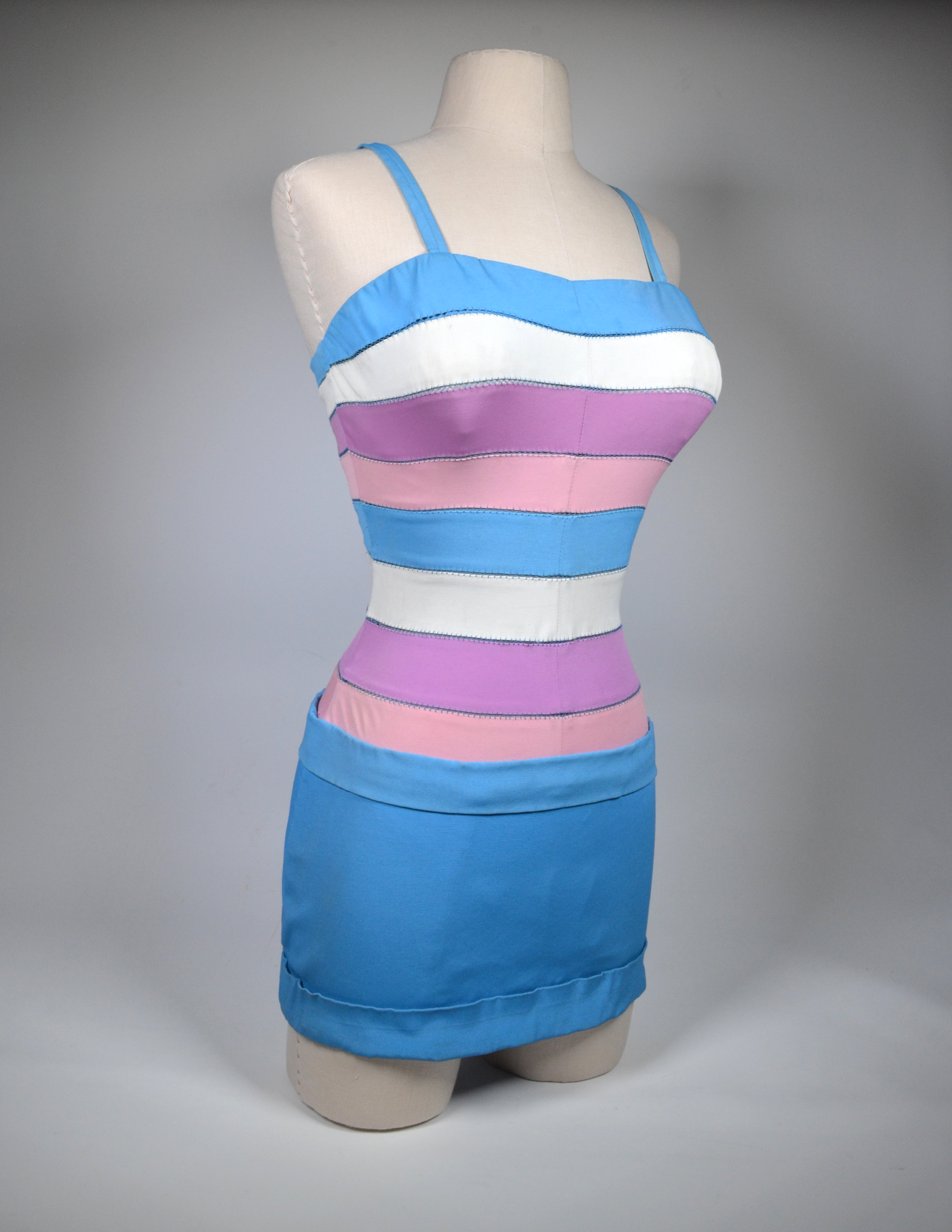
Royal Ribbons Swimsuit

Reid had sales offices in Los Angeles, Chicago, Miami, New York City, London, Amsterdam, and Paris. Due to her success, she traveled frequently, meeting with sales people to provide instruction on fabrics, styles, and designs. She was the first woman in the United States to fly 500,000 miles.

=== Awards and success ===
In 1958, Reid was awarded the Sporting Look of the Year Award by Sports Illustrated and in 1955, she was named one of the Ten Women of the Year by the Los Angeles Times. She was also nominated for Designer of the Year in 1956 by Sports Illustrated, although she didn't win. Her company was extremely successful in the 1950s. The 1951 gross of Rose Marie Reid, Inc. of $3.5 million increased nearly fivefold to $18.1 million by 1960. Combined, her Canadian and U.S. factories increased production between 1952 and 1959 from 1,000 to 10,000 suits per day.

=== Hollywood fame ===
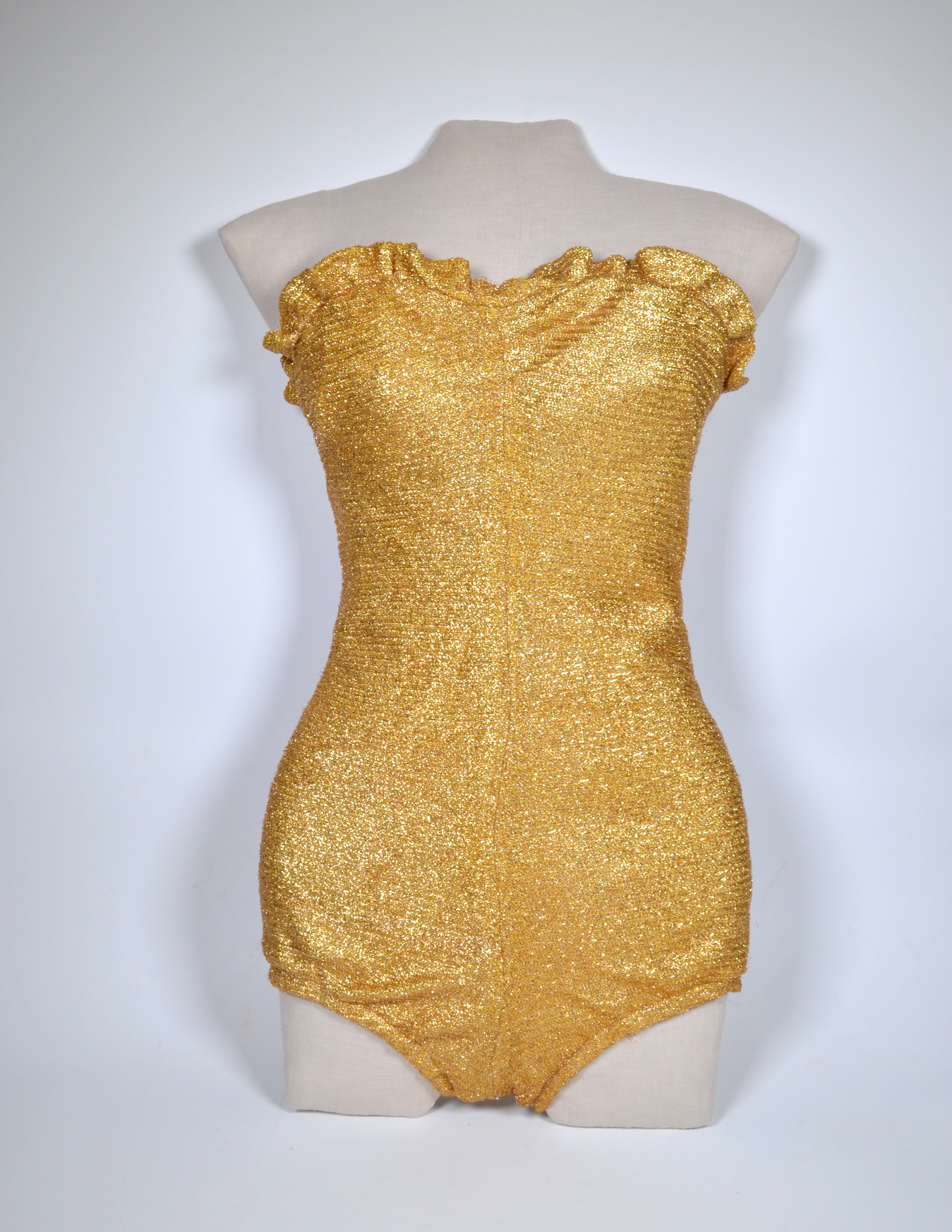
Glittering Metallic Lamé Swimsuit

Part of Reid's success was due to her influence in Hollywood and the motion picture industry. Famous screen actresses, including Rita Hayworth, Marilyn Monroe, Jane Russell, and Rhonda Fleming wore her swimsuits. Rita Hayworth famously wore the "Glittering Metallic Lamé" suit to publicize her 1946 hit film, Gilda. Her suits also appeared in several California beach party films from the late 1950s and the early 1960s, including Gidget (film), Muscle Beach Party, and Where the Boys Are.

== Religion ==
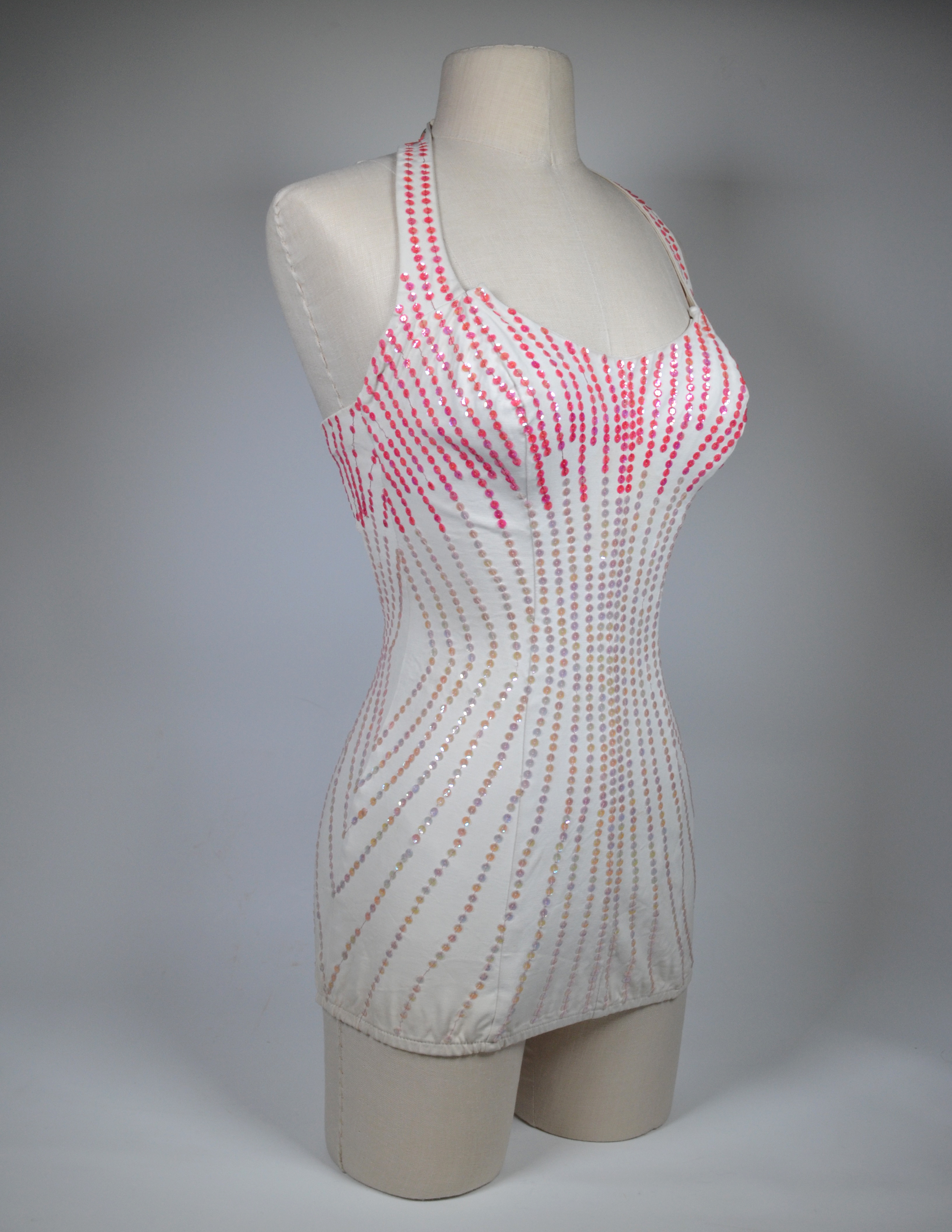
Starlight Swimsuit

Rose Marie Reid was a member of the Church of Jesus Christ of Latter-day Saints. She shared her faith with neighbors and business associates. She also had many Jewish friends with whom she shared her beliefs. She did some of this work in the 1950s in cooperation with LeGrand Richards and Hugh Nibley. Reid suggested that Richards title his book Israel! Do You Know? (instead of the original Judah! Do Yo Know?). With Richards' encouragement, Reid authored a lesson plan for explaining Mormonism to Jewish investigators. Reid also helped with many fundraising efforts for the Church of Jesus Christ of Latter-day Saints, including fundraising for the construction of church buildings and the Los Angeles California Temple in 1954. She designed the "Starlight" swimsuit and had local Relief Society members sew sequins onto the suits. This suit, also known as the "Relief Society Suit", sold for $50. She donated the profits from this extremely commercially successful suit to the construction fund for the temple. "Starlight" was so popular that Life Magazine ran a two-and-a-half page spread about the suit’s success in 1956. In 1959, Rose Marie was asked by the Church of Jesus Christ of Latter-day Saints to redesign LDS temple garments. Rose Marie Reid was also a very generous benefactor to Brigham Young University and served on the National Advisory Council. She also gave a "Devotional" speech at Brigham Young University in 1953.

== Legacy ==
Reid left her company in 1963 over disagreements over the design and production of bikinis. She moved to Provo, Utah, in 1967 to be closer to family. In the late 1960s, Reid helped her son, Bruce, start The R&M Living Wig company. She died on December 16, 1978, in her daughter Carole's home in Provo, Utah.

The largest holding of Rose Marie Reid's papers and swimsuits is in the L. Tom Perry Special Collections of the Harold B. Lee Library at Brigham Young University in Provo, Utah, (see external links). On August 17, 2015, the Harold B. Lee Library launched a 9-month exhibit about Reid's life and career entitled Rose Marie Reid: Glamour by Design. An online exhibit was also released in conjunction with the actual exhibit . Both exhibits were curated by the L. Tom Perry Special Collections curator of 20th- and 21st-century Western and Mormon Americana manuscripts, John Murphy.
