= Renata Forste =

American sociologist

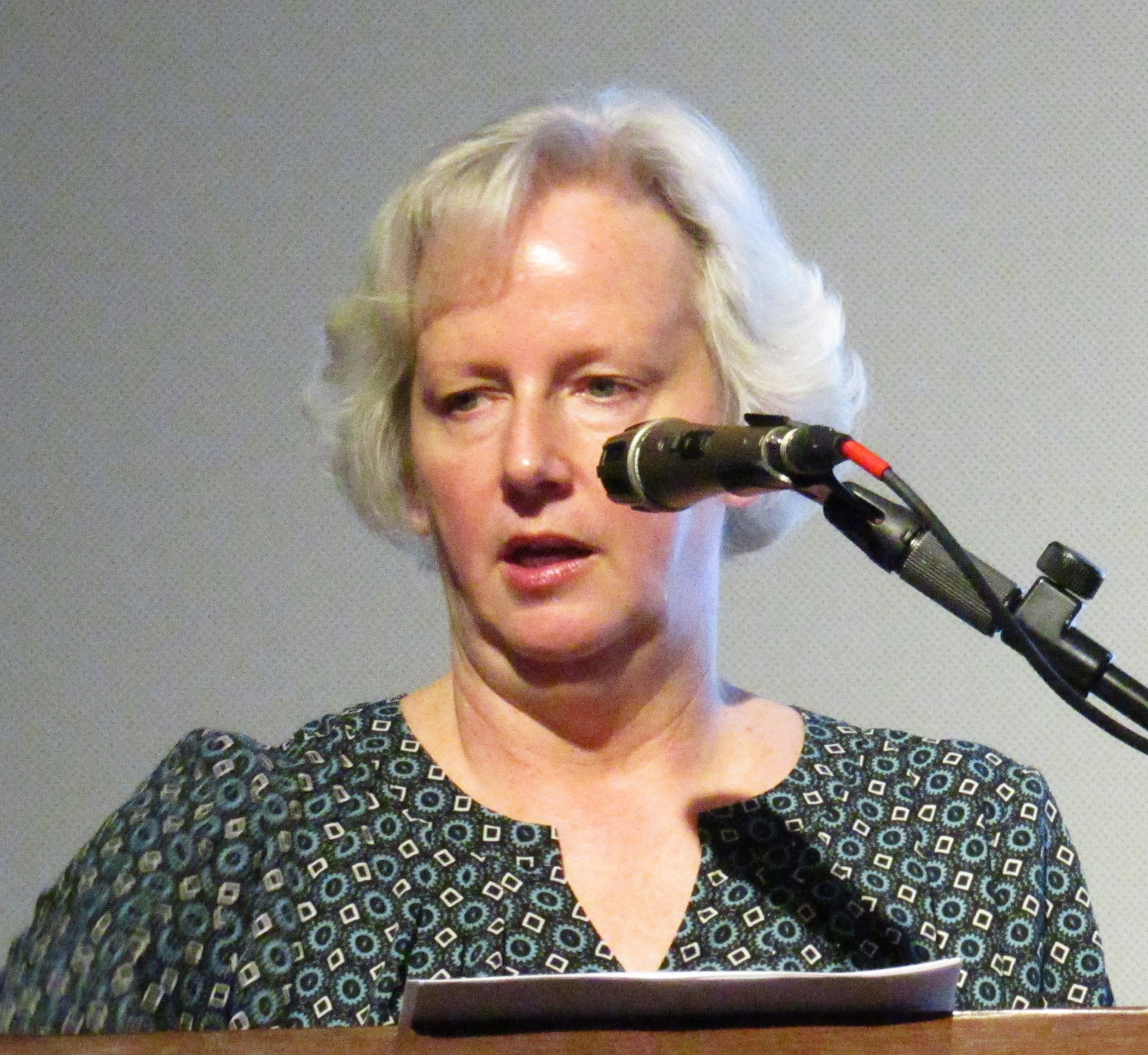
Renata Forste in 2018

Renata Tonks Forste is an American sociologist who specializes in the health and well-being of women and children in Latin America. She has served as the chair of the department of sociology at Brigham Young University (BYU) and has also directed that institutions women's studies program.

== Biography ==
Forste was born in New Mexico and raised in Virginia, Oregon, and the Seattle area. Forste is a Latter-day Saint who sees the faith as more than just church attendance. She has bachelor's and master's degrees from BYU and a Ph.D. from the University of Chicago.

Forste joined the BYU faculty in 1995. Previously she was on the faculty of Western Washington University.

In addition to studies related to Latin American, she has done studies on the relationship between breast feeding and women educational levels in the United States.

Forste and her husband Michael are the parents of three daughters.

== Publications ==
Her most widely cited article is "The Decision to Breastfeed in the United States: Does Race Matter" published in the journal Pediatrics with Jessica Weiss and Emily Lippinoctt in Vol. 108, No 2, in August 2001. Her next most cited article is Sexual Exclusivity Among Dating, Cohabitation and Married Women published with Koray Tanfer in the Journal of Marriage and Family Vol. 58, no. 1, February 1996. She also wrote the 1984 book Education for Women at Brigham Young University: Students Perception of Opportunities, Problems and Stereotypes under her maiden name Renata Tonks. She has also published a study in the journal Fathering that suggests non-father positive male role models can be very helpful to boys as they develop, especially those who lack fathers of their own.
