= James A. Toronto =

James Albert Toronto (born 1951) was a professor of Arabic language and Islamic religion at Brigham Young University (BYU). He was previously a professor of comparative religion at the same institution. Currently, he serves as the president of the Rome Italy Temple.

== Biography ==
Toronto was born in Indio, California to Robert F. Toronto. James Toronto is a descendant of the early Latter-day Saint missionary in Italy, Joseph Toronto. As a young man, Toronto also served a mission in Italy.

Toronto received his BA in English with minors in history and Italian from BYU. He then received his MA and PhD in Islamic and Arabic Studies from Harvard University. He completed his PhD in 1992.

Toronto joined the BYU faculty in 1992. Besides being a faculty member at BYU, Toronto has served as assistant director of BYU's David M. Kennedy Center for International Studies and for three years was the director of BYU's Center for Cultural and Educational Affairs in Amman, Jordan. In 2012 he was made the coordinator of BYU's Middle East Studies/Arabic program.

Toronto has written several articles on the Church of Jesus Christ of Latter-day Saints in both Italy and the Middle-East. He also edited and annotated the journals of Joseph Wilford Booth, which were published in 2004. He has also studied Muslim immigration to Italy, Islamic law and Islamic education. He was coeditor of Religions and Constitutional Transitions in the Muslim Mediterranean: The Pluralistic Moment (Routledge, 2016).

Toronto is married to the former Diane Gillett. They are the parents of two children. They currently serve as president and matron of the Rome Italy Temple.

Toronto is a Latter-day Saint. He was the president of the Provo Utah Sharon East Stake from 1999 to 2007. Toronto was the president of the church's Italy Catania Mission from 2007 to 2010. From 2015-2017 he was president of the Central Eurasian Mission, covering Turkey, Central Asia and Azerbaijan.

Toronto co-authored the 2017 book Mormons in the Piazza: History of The Latter-day Saints in Italy with Eric R. Dursteler and Michael W. Homer.
