= Ugo A. Perego =

Italian geneticist and Mormon apologist

Ugo A. Perego is a population geneticist whose main focuses of study have been the origins of Native Americans and the DNA of Joseph Smith, among others. Perego is also a member of the Church of Jesus Christ of Latter-day Saints.

He has received Bachelor's and Master's Degrees in health sciences from Brigham Young University and a PhD in genetics and biomolecular sciences from the University of Pavia under the mentorship of Antonio Torroni. Perego has lectured extensively internationally, authoring and co-authoring numerous articles on the use of DNA to research ancient population migrations, genealogies, and history, including Mormon history.

From 2000 to 2012, Perego was a senior researcher at the Sorenson Molecular Genealogy Foundation (SMGF) and a scientific consultant for GeneTree, both located in Salt Lake City, Utah. From 2012 to 2021, he was the director of the Rome Italy Institute of Religion and an S&I Coordinator in Central Italy and Malta for The Church of Jesus Christ of Latter-day Saints. He is currently a Professor of Biology for the Southeastern Community College in Iowa and a visiting scientist at Professor Alessandro Achilli’s Laboratory of Population Genetics at the University of Pavia in Italy.

== Sources ==
- Article mentioning Perego's work on the genetic origins of Native Americans
- FairMormon Bio
- Deseret News, July 9, 2011
- Deseret News, August 8, 2008
- Genetic Genealogist article on Perego
- National Geographic article that quotes Perego on the genetic origins of Native Americans
- NPR article mentioning Perego
- "Associated Press". AP Worldstream. March 13, 2008. Archived from the original on September 24, 2015 – via HighBeam Research.
- Full list of scientific publications on PubMed.org
