= Armand Mauss =

American sociologist (1928–2020)

Armand Lind Mauss
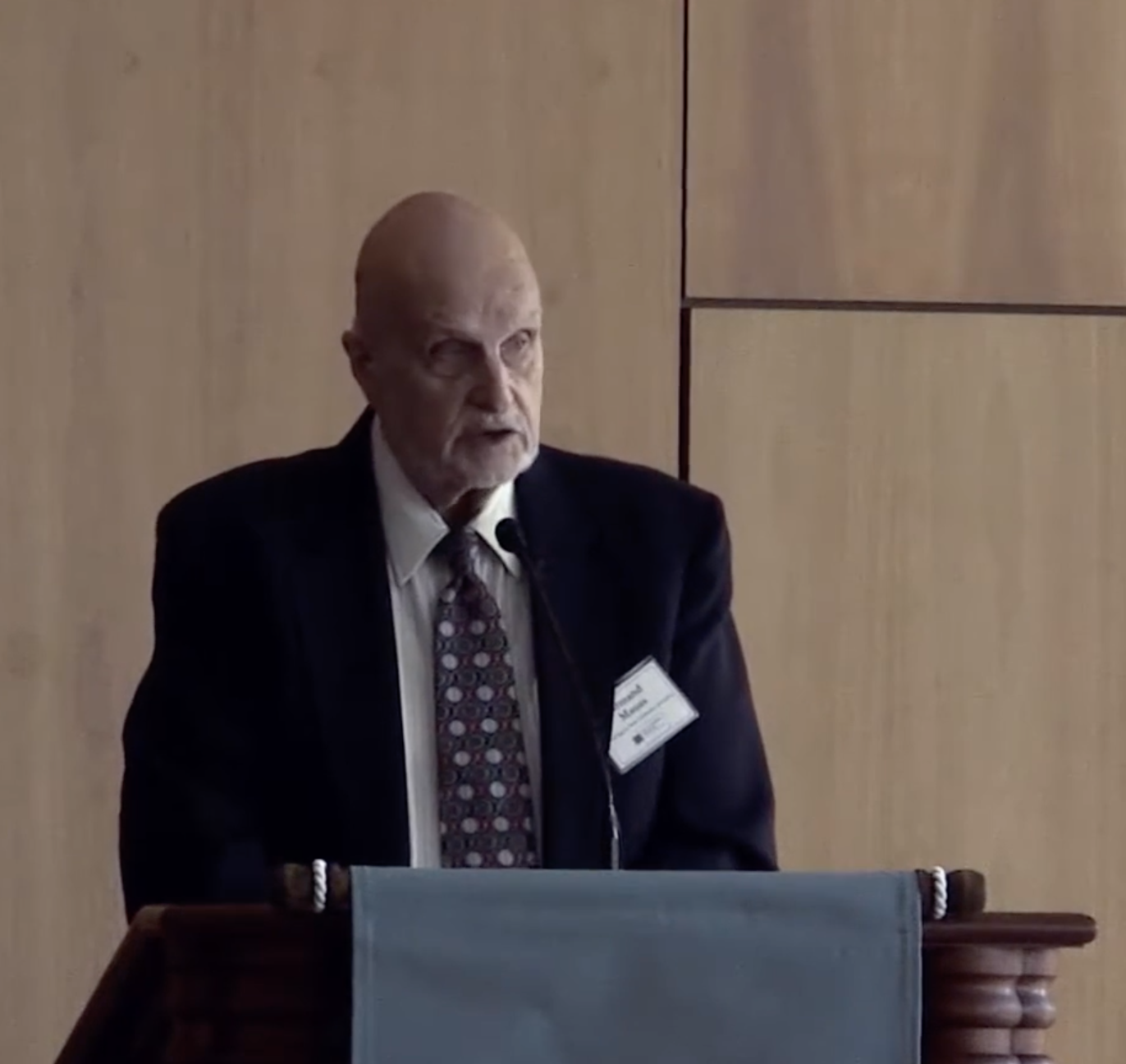
- Mauss in 2016
- Born: June 5, 1928; Salt Lake City, Utah, US
- Died: August 1, 2020 (aged 92); Irvine, California, US
- Spouse: Ruth E. Hathaway (m. 1951)
- Children: 8

Academic background
- Education: Sophia University; University of California, Berkeley
- Thesis: Mormonism and Minorities (1970)

Academic work
- Discipline: Sociology
- Sub-discipline: Sociology of religion; Mormon history
- Institutions: Utah State University; Washington State University
- Notable works: All Abraham's Children (2003)

Armand Lind Mauss (June 5, 1928 – August 1, 2020) was an American sociologist specializing in the sociology of religion. He was professor emeritus of sociology and religious studies at Washington State University and was the most frequently published author of sociology works on Mormons during his long career. A special conference on his work in Mormon studies was held in 2013 at California's Claremont Graduate University (CGU), the papers from which were subsequently published by the University of Utah Press in the format of a Festschrift, where he was honored as "one of the most prominent Mormon intellectuals of the late twentieth and early twenty-first centuries".

== Early life and family ==
Mauss was born on 5 June 1928 in Salt Lake City, Utah, and grew up in California, graduating from Oakland High School in 1946. A lifelong member of the Church of Jesus Christ of Latter-day Saints, as a young adult he served a full-time, two-year mission for the church in New England, and he served throughout his life in many other lay ecclesiastical roles. In 1949, he accompanied his family to Japan where his father was called to preside over the missionary work of the LDS Church in east Asia. In 1954, Mauss graduated from Sophia University of Tokyo, a distinguished Jesuit institution, with a B.A. in History and Asian Studies. While in Japan, he was also inducted into the US Air Force, serving four years in military intelligence. In 1950, he met Ruth E. Hathaway, and they married in 1951. They eventually became parents of six sons and two daughters. After returning to California, Mauss earned in 1957 an M.A. degree in history, with an emphasis on Asia, and in 1970, he earned a Ph.D. in Sociology, with a dissertation titled Mormonism and Minorities, both at the University of California, Berkeley.

== Academic work ==
After several years of community college teaching in California, Mauss joined the faculty at Utah State University (USU) for two years. He next served on the Sociology faculty at Washington State University (WSU) for three decades, starting in 1969 and formally retiring from WSU in 1999. During his career, he taught and published in several different fields of Sociology and Social Problems, but his work in the Sociology of Religion was ultimately the most visible. He has enjoyed invitations as a visiting professor to several universities in California, Canada and the United Kingdom. During 2004–2010, he was a visiting scholar in the School of Religion at CGU, where he taught courses on the History and Sociology of the Mormons. While at CGU, he helped develop the Mormon Studies Council and the Howard W. Hunter Chair in Mormon Studies, first occupied by Richard L. Bushman.

Author or editor of several books and scores of academic articles, Mauss also served as editor of the Journal for the Scientific Study of Religion from 1989 to 1992. He has received three different awards from the Mormon History Association for his books and other works and two awards from the Dialogue Foundation for his articles in Dialogue: A Journal of Mormon Thought, the major independent scholarly journal in Mormon Studies. Mauss had a formative influence on the rise and survival of Dialogue, serving 20 years on its editorial or advisory boards and then ten years as either chairman or member of the Dialogue Foundation's board of directors. Mauss was, additionally, president of the Mormon History Association from 1997 to 1998.

== Publications ==
Books

- Social Problems as Social Movements. Philadelphia: J. B. Lippincott & Co. 1975. ISBN 0-397-47325-7.
- This Land of Promises: The Rise and Fall of Social Problems in America. Philadelphia: J. B. Lippincott & Co. 1977. ISBN 0-397-47371-0. (Edited with Julie C. Wolfe).
- Neither White nor Black: Mormon Scholars Encounter the Race Issue in a Universal Church. Midvale, Utah: Signature Books. 1984. ISBN 0-941-21422-2.(Second Author/Editor with Lester E. Bush Jr.)
- The Angel and the Beehive: The Mormon Struggle with Assimilation. Urbana, Illinois: University of Illinois Press. 1994. ISBN 0-252-02071-5.
- All Abraham's Children: Changing Mormon Conceptions of Race and Lineage. Urbana, Illinois: University of Illinois Press. April 2003. ISBN 0-252-02803-1.
- Shifting Borders and a Tattered Passport: Intellectual Journeys of a Mormon Academic. Salt Lake City: University of Utah Press. 2012. ISBN 978-1-607-81204-3.

Representative essays and articles

- "Mormonism and Secular Attitudes toward Negroes," Pacific Sociological Review 9(2):91–99l (1966). (Journal later renamed Sociological Perspectives.)
- "Mormon Semitism and Anti-Semitism," Sociological Analysis 29(1):11–27 (1968). (Journal later renamed Sociology of Religion.)
- "Skidders and their Servants: Variable Goals and Functions of the Skidroad 'Rescue Mission,'" Journal for the Scientific Study of Religion 13(4):421–36 (1974). (Second author with Reginald W. Bibby.)
- "On Being Strangled by the Stars and Stripes:The New Left, the Old Left, and the Natural History of American Radical Movements," Journal of Social Issues 27(1):183–202 (1971).
- The Problematic Prospects for Prevention: Should Alcohol Education Programs Be Expected to Reduce Drinking by Youth? Journal of Studies on Alcohol 49(1): 51-61 (1988). (First author with Ronald H. Hopkins, Ralph A. Weisheit, and Kathleen A. Kearney.)
- Salvation and Survival on Skid Row: A Critical Comment, Social Forces 60(3): 898-904 (1982).
- "Strictly Speaking . . . : Kelley's Quandary and the Vineyard Christian Fellowship," Journal for the Scientific Study of Religion32(2):125–135 (1993). (Second author with Robin D Perrin.)
- "Apostasy and the Management of Spoiled Identity" in The Politics of Apostasy: The Role of Apostates in the Transformation of Religious Movements, ed. David G. Bromley (New York: Praeger, 1998), 51–73.
- "Mormonism's Worldwide Aspirations and Its Changing Conceptions of Race and Lineage," Dialogue: A Journal of Mormon Thought 34(3–4):103–133 (2001).
- "The Emergence of Mormon Studies in the Social Sciences, in "American Sociology of Religion: Histories," ed. Anthony J. Blasi (Leiden and Boston: Brill Academic Publishers, 2007), 121–150.
- "Seeking the 'Second Harvest'? Controlling the Costs of Latter-day Saint Membership in Europe," Dialogue: A Journal of Mormon Thought 41:1–54 (2008).
- Authority and Dissent among the Latter-day Saints, in The Oxford Handbook of Mormonism, eds. Terry L. Givens and Philip Barlow (New York and Oxford, UK:Oxford University Press,2015).
