= BYU Religious Education =

Division of Brigham Young University

Coordinates: 40°14′45″N 111°39′06″W

Religious Education at Brigham Young University (BYU) (formerly called the College of Religious Education) administers programs related to Latter-day Saint religious teaching at the university. In the past, it has granted various master's and Doctor of Religious Education degrees. Currently its only degree programs are a Master of Arts (MA) in religious education, primarily aimed at full-time Church Educational System employees, and an MA program for military chaplains. Most students who take courses with Religious Education are studying other topics, since BYU undergraduate students have to take the equivalent of one religion course per semester.

== Departments ==
Religious Education at BYU consists of two departments, Church History and Doctrine and Ancient Scripture. Church History and Doctrine focuses on courses related to the Doctrine and Covenants, missionary work, the religious history of the Church of Jesus Christ of Latter-day Saints (LDS Church) and temples. These courses focus primarily on doctrines and theology and are largely devotional in nature. BYU also offers more historically oriented courses related to LDS Church history through its history department, some of which are taught by faculty members whose main appointment is with the religion department.

The department of Ancient Scripture teaches courses related to the Holy Bible, the Book of Mormon and the Pearl of Great Price.

The work of Religious Education faculty members is often published by its publication arm, the Religious Studies Center, or through BYU's Neal A. Maxwell Institute.

Religious Education is not designated as a college. It has approximately 70 full-time faculty members. The current dean is Scott C. Esplin.

== History ==
Prior to 1929 religion-related instruction at BYU was termed theology. In that year it was renamed religious education. George H. Brimhall, who was the president emeritus was the only full-time religion instructor before 1930. Other classes in religion were taught by faculty from other fields. Having faculty with their main expertise in other fields teach religion is still done at BYU, but the full-time religion faculty is now much more numerous.

Guy C. Wilson, an alumnus of BYU, the University of Chicago, and Columbia University was hired as the director of BYU's religious education program in 1930. Wilson had also been the first seminary teacher ever. In the early 1930s, Sidney B. Sperry and Russel Swensen, also University of Chicago alumni, were added as full-time religion faculty.

In 1932, the department of religious education was made part of the BYU College of Education. In 1940 the department was split off and made the Division of Religious Instruction, a college-level entity, with J. Wyley Sessions as its first head. The division was divided into four sections, Bible and Modern Scripture (Sperry as head), Church Organization and Administration (Wesley Lloyd as head), Church History (Swensen as head), and Theology (Sessions as head).

In 1946, the BYU Department of Archeology was organized as part of the Division of Religious Instruction. In about 1953, that department was moved to the BYU College of Humanities and Social Sciences. The section or department of theology was renamed in 1952 to the Department of Theology and Religious Philosophy. Its name was later shortened to Department of Theology and Philosophy.

In 1959, the Division of Religious Instruction was renamed to the College of Religious Instruction. David H. Yarn, an alumnus of BYU and Columbia University was chosen as the first dean. All the departments were reformatted or renamed at that point. The Bible and Modern Scripture Department retained its name, but a new Biblical Languages department was formed that absorbed some of that department's old components. The Theology and Philosophy and the Church History departments were merged into the History and Philosophy of Religions Department. The Church Organization and Administration Department was renamed the LDS Theology, Church Organizations and Administration Department. This last was the shortest lived of the changes, it was renamed in 1961 to the Theology and Church Administration Department. In 1964, the college was reduced to two departments. Biblical Literature was moved to the BYU College of Humanities. The remaining departments were re-organized into the Undergraduate Studies in Religious Instruction and the Graduate Studies in Religious Instruction Departments. This organization persisted until 1973, when the college was again renamed to being the Department of Ancient Scripture and the Department of Church History and Doctrine. In 1969, BYU created a philosophy department outside of the College of Religious Instruction.

The 1973 organization of the current departments also saw the program designated as Religious Instruction with no other modifiers.

== List of deans of Religious Education ==
The following have served as deans since the College of Religious Instruction was officially organized:

- David H. Yarn Jr. (1959–1962)
- B. West Belnap (1962–1967)
- Daniel H. Ludlow (1968–1971)
- Roy W. Doxey (1971–1974)
- Jeffrey R. Holland (1974–1976)
- Ellis T. Rasmussen (1976–1981)
- Robert J. Matthews (1981–1991)
- Robert L. Millet (1991–2000)
- Andrew C. Skinner (2000–2005)
- Terry B. Ball (2006–2013)
- Brent L. Top (2013–2018)
- Daniel K. Judd (2019–2021)
- Scott C. Esplin (2021–Present)
