= Ellis T. Rasmussen =

American religious historian (1915–2011)

Ellis Theo Rasmussen (September 21, 1915 – June 6, 2011) was an American professor and dean of Religious Instruction at Brigham Young University (BYU). He helped produce the edition of the Bible published by the Church of Jesus Christ of Latter-day Saints (LDS Church) in 1979.

== Biography ==
Born to Wilford and Kate Nelson Rasmussen.

As a young man in the 1930s, Rasmussen attended Snow College in Ephraim, Utah, where he was forensic manager of the student body and received an associates degree in education.

In the 1940s, Rasmussen married Oda Fonnesbeck. They had five children and resided in Orem, Utah. Rasmussen died at his home on June 6, 2011.

=== Church service ===
In 1939 Rasmussen served as a missionary for the LDS Church in the western German Mission. When the German borders were closing during the onset of World War II, Rasmussen led several missionaries in an escape to Denmark, then back to the United States. He completed his missionary service in the Southern States Mission, where he served as mission secretary.

Throughout his life Rasmussen served in the LDS Church, including as a bishop, high councilor, counselor in a stake presidency, temple ordinance worker, and Stake Patriarch in Orem, Utah.

=== Education ===
After his mission, in 1942, Rasmussen received his bachelor's degree from BYU. That fall, he went to Weston, Idaho to teach in high school and LDS Church seminary. During the summer, he continued graduate work at BYU under his mentor, Sidney B. Sperry, who urged him to study Old Testament languages. Sperry helped Rasmussen become a part-time teacher at BYU in 1949. This helped him complete his master's degree in 1951 and then begin teaching full-time at BYU.

With Sperry's encouragement, a sabbatical leave grant, and a private donation, Rasmussen pursued doctoral studies in the language and literature of the Old Testament at Dropsie College for Hebrew and Cognate Learning, in Philadelphia, Pennsylvania from 1957 to 1958. He completed his Ph.D. at BYU in 1967, with his dissertation entitled "Relationship of God and Man According to a Text and Targum of Deuteronomy".

=== Career ===
Rasmussen taught at BYU for over thirty years. By the 1960s he was chair of the Biblical Languages Department, followed by chair of the Ancient Scripture Department, and Assistant Dean of Religious Instruction. In 1976, Rasmussen became dean of Religious Instruction and Director of BYU's Religious Studies Center, replacing Jeffrey R. Holland who had left to become Commissioner of Church Education. In 1981, Rasmussen stepped down from these positions and was replaced by Robert J. Matthews. He received the Division Faculty Teaching Award from the BYU Division of Continuing Education in 1980, and was retired from teaching by the mid-1980s.

At BYU Rasmussen had been an early member of the Society for Early Historic Archaeology in 1949, where he served on its advisory committee and as symposium chairman in 1972. He also spent time in Israel for BYU as a leader of travel study tours and Special Representative.

Rasmussen assisted several significant LDS Church publishing efforts. In the 1970s he served on the church's Correlation Committee and on a committee to assist the church's Ensign magazine with scriptural articles. Being skilled in Hebrew, Rasmussen was given leave from his administrative duties at BYU during 1973–74 to work on the church's Scripture Publication Committee that produced the 1979 LDS edition of the Bible. He later also assisted in developing the 1981 LDS editions of the Doctrine and Covenants and Pearl of Great Price. He contributed articles on the Old Testament to the 1992 Encyclopedia of Mormonism and participated in the encyclopedia's final editing.

Rasmussen has been described as among the LDS scholars familiar with "biblical languages and modern critical methodology" seeking academic credibility, yet "dogmatic" and "apologetic" in their support of traditional LDS orthodoxy.

== Writings ==
Rasmussen authored the LDS Church's 1965 Sunday School manual on the Old Testament, and his best known work is A Latter-day Saint Commentary on the Old Testament, published in 1993.

=== Books ===
- —— (1965). Patriarchs of the Old Testament. Gospel Doctrine Class manual for the Sunday Schools. Salt Lake City, Utah: Deseret Sunday School Union.
- —— (1967). An Introduction to the Old Testament and Its Teachings. Syllabus for Religion 301. Provo, Utah: Brigham Young University Press. p. 161.
- —— (1969). An Introduction to the Old Testament and Its Teachings. Syllabus for Religion 302, Part II. Provo, Utah: Brigham Young University Press. p. 134.
- —— (1972). An Introduction to the Old Testament and Its Teachings (2 volumes). Syllabus for Religion 301–302. Provo, Utah: Brigham Young University.
- —— (1972). An Introduction to the Old Testament and Its Teachings. Syllabus for Religion 301, part I (2nd ed.). Provo, Utah: Brigham Young University, College of Religious Instruction. p. 204.
- —— (1974). An Introduction to the Old Testament and Its Teachings. Syllabus for Religion 302, part II (2nd ed.). Provo, Utah: Brigham Young University, College of Religious Instruction. p. 157.
- —— Ogden, D. Kelly (1992). Old Testament, Religion 301 Independent Study Student Manual. Provo, Utah: Brigham Young University, Department of Independent Study.
- —— (1993). A Latter-day Saint Commentary on the Old Testament. Salt Lake City, Utah: Deseret Book. ISBN 0-87579-712-1.

=== Articles ===
- —— (February 1962). "Isaiah: A Messenger of God". The Instructor (Center insert). 97.
- —— (March 1962). "Ezekiel: An Exiled Prophet". The Instructor (Center insert). 97.
- —— (April 1962). "Hosea: A Prophet to Northern Israel". The Instructor (Center insert). 97.
- —— (July 1962). "Joel: His Message Is for Us". The Instructor (Center insert). 97.
- —— (August 1962). "Nahum: A Poet-Prophet". The Instructor (Center insert). 97.
- —— (September 1962). "Habakkuk: A Prophet with a Problem". The Instructor (Center insert). 97.
- —— (October 1962). "Haggai: Prophet to the Temple Builders". The Instructor (Center insert). 97.
- —— (February 1963). "Zechariah: Prophet to a New Generation". The Instructor (Center insert). 98.
- —— (May 1963). "Malachi: Prophet of Fulfillment". The Instructor (Center insert). 98.
- —— (July 1963). "Zephaniah, Obadiah, and Micah: Prophets During Times of Crisis". The Instructor (Center insert). 98.
- —— (Autumn 1968). "[Book review of] Doctrinal commentary on the Pearl of Great Price, by Hyrum L. Andrus". BYU Studies. 9 (1): 111–15.
- —— (Winter 1970). "The New English Bible: The Old Testament". Dialogue: A Journal of Mormon Thought. 5 (4): 94–102. doi:10.2307/45227709. JSTOR 45227709. S2CID 254398972.
- —— (March 1971). "Judaism". Ensign: 40.
- —— (November 1971). "Zoroastrianism". Ensign: 32.
- —— (May 1972). "Religion in Israel Today". Ensign: 59.
- —— (February 1973). "The Language of the Old Testament". Ensign: 34.
- —— (October 1973). "The Unchanging Gospel of Two Testaments". Ensign: 24.
- —— (October 1973). "In terms of strength and power and significance, was Israel ever a nation truly to be reckoned with by the major powers throughout the Old Testament?". Ensign: 76.
- —— (December 1974). "If Satan had never come to earth, would there still be evil?". New Era: 13.
- —— (January 1975). "What do we know of Jesus' use of the Hebrew scriptures?". Ensign: 23.
- —— (May 1979). "In Honor of Sidney B. Sperry". Newsletter and Proceedings of the S.E.H.A. (143). Society for Early Historic Archaeology: 1–6.
- —— (September 1980). "Why Does the Book of Moses End With Noah?". Ensign: 51–52.
- —— (December 1981). "What Were the False Ideologies, Values, and Practices that Tempted Israel During the Old Testament Period?". Ensign. 11 (12): 62–63.
- —— (July 1986). "Sidney B. Sperry: Student of the Book of Mormon". Ensign. 16 (6): 24–27.
- —— (January 1987). "What Are the Best Evidences to Support the Authenticity of the Book of Mormon?". Ensign. 17 (1): 53–55.
- ——. "Abrahamic Covenant". In Daniel H. Ludlow (ed.). Encyclopedia of Mormonism. Vol. 1. New York: Macmillan. pp. 9–10. Archived from the original on 2010-01-09.
- ——. "Deuteronomy". In Daniel H. Ludlow (ed.). Encyclopedia of Mormonism. Vol. 1. New York: Macmillan. pp. 378–79.
- ——. "Old Testament". In Daniel H. Ludlow (ed.). Encyclopedia of Mormonism. Vol. 3. New York: Macmillan. pp. 1027–30. Archived from the original on 2009-12-02.
- —— (Spring 1995). "Sidney B. Sperry, As I Remember and Appreciate Him". Journal of Book of Mormon Studies. 4 (1): xxiv–xxvi. JSTOR 44758760. S2CID 165144843.
- —— (January 3, 1998). "Revisit Old Testament for New Treasures". Church News. Salt Lake City, Utah: Deseret News. pp. 4, 7.

=== Papers ===
- Rasmussen, Ellis T. (1951). Textual Parallels to the Doctrine and Covenants and Book of Commandments as Found in the Bible (Master's thesis). Provo, Utah: Brigham Young University, Division of Religion..
- —— (1954), Search the Scriptures, Leadership Week, Provo, Utah: Brigham Young University, p. 56.
- —— (1956), Helping Children Understand the Articles of Faith, 33rd Annual Leadership Week, Provo, Utah: Brigham Young University, Extension Division.
- —— (June 4–9, 1960), "Gospel Teachings from the Old Testament", BYU Leadership, 37th Annual Leadership Week, Provo, Utah: Brigham Young University, pp. 31–48.
- —— (1960). "Contributions of the Pearl of Great Price to Understanding the Old Testament". Pearl of Great Price Conference. Provo, Utah: Brigham Young University. pp. 28–36.
- —— (1967), Relationships of God and Man According to a Text and Targum of Deuteronomy, Doctoral dissertation, Provo, Utah: Brigham Young University, Department of Graduate Studies in Religious Instruction.
- —— (1975). "Abraham the Prophet". Pearl of Great Price Symposium, 22 November 1975. pp. 88–94.
- —— (1978). "The Abrahamic Covenant and Mission in the Old and New Testament". Sidney B. Sperry Symposium. Provo, Utah: BYU Press. pp. 11–35.
- —— (August 16–18, 1979). "The New LDS Edition of the King James Version of the Bible: Its Development and Significance". Church Educational System Religious Educators' Symposium. pp. 27–30.
- —— (August 16–18, 1979). "The Passover: The Event and Its Significance". Church Educational System Religious Educators' Symposium. pp. 31–36.
- —— (1979). "Some Contributions of the Doctrine and Covenants to Our Understanding of the Bible". The Seventh Annual Sidney B. Sperry Symposium: The Doctrine and Covenants. Provo, Utah: Religious Instruction, Brigham Young University, and Church Educational System. pp. 154–163.
- —— (May 27, 1980), Follow Prophets' Lessons, Devotional speech, Provo, Utah: Brigham Young University.
- —— (March 19–20, 1982), "The Prophets and the Mission", in Monte S. Nyman (ed.), Isaiah and the Prophets: Inspired Voices from the Old Testament, Provo, Utah: Religious Studies Center, Brigham Young University (published 1984), pp. 139–49, ISBN 0-88494-522-7
- —— (1995). "A Tribute to Sidney B. Sperry". Nurturing Faith Through the Book of Mormon. The 24th Annual Sidney B. Sperry Symposium. Salt Lake City, Utah: Deseret Book. pp. xi–xxxviii. ISBN 1-57345-159-2.
