= Camille Fronk Olson =

American theologian and scholar

Camille Fronk Olson is a retired professor and former chair of Brigham Young University's (BYU) Department of Ancient Scripture in Religious Education and a scholar who has written multiple books on the role of women in the scriptures. She has also spoken widely in various forums on Latter-day Saint beliefs, especially as they relate to women.

== Biography ==
Olson was born and raised in the area of Tremonton, Utah. She served a mission for the Church of Jesus Christ of Latter-day Saints in the France Toulouse Mission of southern France. She has a bachelor's degree in Education from Utah State University. She has an MA in West Asian Studies and a PhD in Sociology of the Middle East from BYU. She began her educational career as a full-time seminary teacher, at a time when few women held this position. She then was on the faculty of LDS Business College where she also served as the dean of students. She was the first woman who was a full-time member of BYU's Department of Ancient Scripture faculty. She has also served as a member of the Young Women General Board of the LDS Church and as a professor at the BYU Jerusalem Center.

She is married to Paul F. Olson, who is an ophthalmologist.

Among her works are the books Women of the Old Testament, Women of the New Testament (published 2014), Too Much to Carry Alone, Mary, the Mother of Jesus, Mary, Martha and Me: Seeking the One Thing That is Needful, Giver of Life: Lessons From Eve, Taking the Great Commission Seriously, Becoming Perfect in Christ, Be Of Good Cheer, and In the Hands of the Potter. She co-authored with Robert L. Millet, Brent L. Top and Andrew C. Skinner LDS Belief: A Doctrinal Reference. She also co-authored With Healing In His Wings with Thomas A. Wayment. Also with Wayment as well as Brian M. Hauglid she co-edited The Fullness of the Gospel: Foundational Teachings from the Book of Mormon. She is also one of the contributors to Do Not Attempt in Heels: Mission Stories and Advice From Women Who Have Been There. She has also been a contributing scholar to some BYUtv productions. She also wrote an article in the Journal of Book of Mormon Studies Entitled Deseret Epiphany: Sariah and the women of 1st Nephi.

She also coauthored with Ray L. Huntington and Bruce A. Chadwick a paper on educational trends in Palestine.

== Selected speeches ==
- "Lessons from the Potter and the Clay" – Devotional address given at Brigham Young University on March 7, 1995
- "In the World Ye Shall Have Tribulation, but Be of Good Cheer: I Have Overcome the World" – Devotional address given at Brigham Young University on April 30, 2004
