= Joseph Smith Translation =

Biblical revision by Joseph Smith

- Full name: Inspired Version of the Holy Scriptures or Joseph Smith Translation of the Bible
- Abbreviation: IV or JST depending on denomination
- Complete Bible published: 1867
- Copyright: Public domain
- Genesis 1:1–3 Yea, in the beginning I created the heaven, and the earth upon which thou standest. And the earth was without form, and void; and I caused darkness to come up upon the face of the deep. And my Spirit moved upon the face of the waters, for I am God. And I, God, said, Let there be light, and there was light. John 3:16 For God so loved the world, that he gave his Only Begotten Son, that whosoever believeth on him should not perish, but have everlasting life.

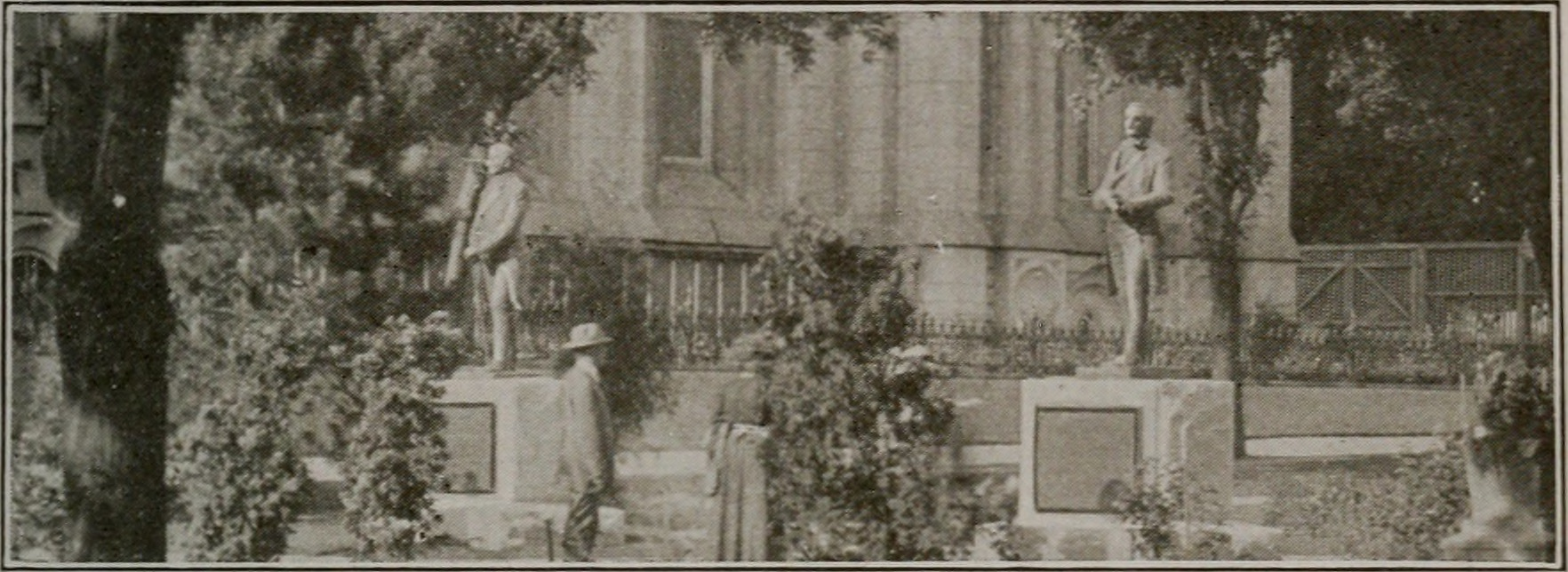
Statues of Joseph and Hyrum Smith

The Joseph Smith Translation (JST), also called the Inspired Version of the Holy Scriptures (IV), is a revision of the Bible by Joseph Smith, the founder of the Latter Day Saint movement, who said that the JST/IV was intended to restore what he described as "many important points touching the salvation of men, [that] had been taken from the Bible, or lost before it was compiled". Smith was killed before he deemed it complete, though most of his work on it was performed about a decade beforehand. The work is the King James Version of the Bible (KJV) with some significant additions and revisions. It is considered a sacred text and is part of the canon of Community of Christ (CoC), formerly the Reorganized Church of Jesus Christ of Latter Day Saints, and other Latter Day Saint churches. The edition of the Bible published by the Church of Jesus Christ of Latter-day Saints (LDS Church) includes selections from the JST in its footnotes and appendix. It has officially canonized only certain excerpts that appear in the Pearl of Great Price. These excerpts are the Book of Moses and Smith's revision of part of the Gospel of Matthew.

== Translation ==
=== The work of revision ===
As with Smith's other translations, he reported that he was forced to "study it out in [his] mind" as part of the revelatory process. During the process, Smith occasionally revisited a given passage of scripture at a later time to give it a "plainer translation."

Philip Barlow observes the six basic types of changes:

- Long additions that have little or no biblical parallel, such as the visions of Moses and Enoch, and the passage on Melchizedek
- "Common-sense" changes (e.g., Genesis 6:6 "And it repented the Lord that he had made man" is revised in Moses 8:25 to read: "And it repented Noah, and his heart was pained that the Lord had made man". God, being perfect, needs no repentance.)
- "Interpretive additions", often signaled by the phrase "or in other words," appending to a passage to clarify
- "Harmonization", reconciled passages that seemed to conflict with other passages
- "Not easily classifiable", frequently the meaning is changed, often idiosyncratically
- Grammatical improvements, technical clarifications, and modernization of terms (by far the most common within the JST/IV)

The JST/IV was a work in progress throughout Smith's ministry, the bulk between June 1830 and July 1833. Some parts of the revision (Genesis and the four Gospels) were completed from beginning to end, including unchanged verses from the KJV; some parts were revised more than once, and others revised one verse at a time. The manuscripts were written, re-written, and in some cases, additional edits were written in the columns, pinned to the paper or otherwise attached. Smith relied on a version of the Bible that included the Apocrypha, and marked off the Bible as verses were examined (the Apocrypha was not included in the JST).

By 1833, Smith said it was sufficiently complete that preparations for publication could begin, though continual lack of time and means prevented it from appearing in its entirety during his lifetime. He continued to make a few revisions and to prepare the manuscript for printing until he was killed in 1844. Regarding the completeness of the JST/IV as we have it, Robert Matthews has written:

[T]he manuscript shows that Smith went all the way through the Bible from Genesis to Revelation. But it also shows that he did not make all the necessary corrections in one effort. This situation makes it impossible to give a statistical answer to questions about how much of the Translation was completed or how much was not completed. What is evident, however, is that any part of the Translation might have been further touched upon and improved by additional revelation and emendation by Smith.

=== Omission of the Song of Songs ===
In his work on the Joseph Smith Translation (JST) of the Bible, Joseph Smith excluded the Song of Songs, labeling it as "not inspired writings." This annotation appears in the original JST manuscript dated July 1832 and is unique among the biblical books, indicating Smith's view that the Song lacked divine inspiration. Consequently, the Song of Songs is absent from the JST. While it remains in the King James Version used by LDS Church, it is seldom referenced in Latter-day Saint teachings.

=== Use of other texts ===
Some scholars infer that Smith had access to Old Testament pseudepigrapha and included insights from these texts in his translation.

In March 2017, Brigham Young University (BYU) professor Thomas A. Wayment and his undergraduate research assistant Haley Wilson-Lemmón published a notice in BYU's Journal of Undergraduate Research suggesting that Smith borrowed heavily from Methodist theologian Adam Clarke's famous Bible commentary. They contend that "direct parallels between Smith's translation and Adam Clarke's biblical commentary are simply too numerous and explicit to posit happenstance or coincidental overlap." They further posit that this evidence is sufficient to "demonstrate Smith's open reliance upon Clarke" before suggesting Sidney Rigdon was likely responsible for urging the use of Clarke's source material. In a May 2018 interview, Wilson-Lemmón indicated that she had provided copies of the research manuscript to the dean of BYU Religious Education. Wayment and Wilson-Lemmón subsequently provided copies to the First Presidency and Quorum of the Twelve Apostles of the LDS Church. This prompted a meeting between Wayment and unidentified church authorities, after which they "got the green light" to publish. (Note: Reel, Bill (11 May 2018). Haley Lemmon – The Joseph Smith Translation – revelation or plagiarism?. Mormon Discussion Inc. (mormondiscussionpodcast.org) (podcast). The LDS Church acknowledged on their website that "[as] [Joseph Smith] worked on these changes [to the JST], he appears in many instances to have consulted respected commentaries by biblical scholars, studying them out in his mind as a part of the revelatory process.") Wayment and Wilson-Lemmón's findings were then published in full on June 26, 2020 in Producing Ancient Scripture: Joseph Smith's Translation Projects in the Development of Mormon Christianity published through University of Utah Press. Wayment then published another article on the topic in the July 2020 issue of the Journal of Mormon History. In October 2020, Latter-day Saint JST scholar and then-former BYU professor Kent P. Jackson published a rebuttal to the findings of Wayment and Wilson-Lemmón in Interpreter: A Journal of Latter-day Saint Faith and Scholarship. Jackson argues that "none of the examples [Wayment and Wilson-Lemmón] provide can be traced to Clarke's commentary, and almost all of them can be explained easily by other means...The few overlaps that do exist are vague, superficial, and coincidental...I do not believe there is Adam Clarke-JST connection at all[.]"

== Doctrinal development ==
Many of Smith's revisions to the Bible led to significant developments in the doctrines of Mormonism. During the process of translation, when he came across troubling biblical issues, Smith often dictated revelations relevant to himself, his associates, or the church. About half of the revelations in the Doctrine and Covenants are in some way connected to this translation process, including background on the Apocrypha (LDS D&C section 91 CofC D&C 88), the three degrees of glory (LDS section 76 CofC Section 85), the eternal nature of marriage and plural marriage (LDS section 132), teachings on baptism for the dead (LDS section 124 CofC Section 107), and various revelations on priesthood (LDS sections 84, 88, 107 CofC Sections 83, 104).

Overall, 3,410 verses in the printed editions of JST/IV differ in textual construction from the KJV (this uses the verse numbering of the JST/IV as the basis for comparison). Of the total of 1,289 verses changed in the Old Testament, 25 correspond to the additions of Book of Moses chapter 1, and 662 occur in the Book of Genesis. Hence, more than half of the changed verses in the JST/IV Old Testament and 20 percent of those in the entire JST/IV Bible are contained in Moses chapter 1 and Genesis, with the most extensive modifications occurring in Genesis chapters 1–24. As a proportion of page count, changes in Genesis occur four times more frequently than in the New Testament and twenty-one times more frequently than in the rest of the Old Testament. The changes in Genesis are not only more numerous, but also more significant in the degree of doctrinal and historical expansion. Jeffrey M. Bradshaw has suggested that one reason for this emphasis may have been "early tutoring in temple-related doctrines received by Joseph Smith as he revised and expanded Genesis 1–24, in conjunction with his later translation of relevant passages in the New Testament and, for example, the stories of Moses and Elijah." Additional evidence suggests that the Book of Moses itself could be seen as a temple text, in the sense discussed by BYU professor John W. Welch.

== Publication and use by the Community of Christ ==
Smith was killed prior to the publication of the JST/IV. At his death, the manuscripts and documents pertaining to the translation were retained by his widow, Emma Smith, who would not give them to the Quorum of the Twelve, although Willard Richards, apparently acting on behalf of Brigham Young, requested the manuscript from her. Consequently, when Young's followers moved to the Salt Lake Valley, they did so without the new translation of the Bible.

Following Smith's death, John Milton Bernhisel asked permission of Emma Smith to use the manuscript to copy notes into his own KJV Bible. Bernhisel spent much of the spring of 1845 working on this project. The LDS Church has Bernhisel's Bible in its archives, but it contains less than half of the corrections and is not suitable for publication. For many years the "Bernhisel Bible" was the only JST/IV source for LDS Church members living in the Salt Lake Valley.

In 1866, Emma Smith gave the manuscript into the custody of the Reorganized Church of Jesus Christ of Latter Day Saints (RLDS Church), of which she was a member, and her son Joseph Smith III, its prophet-president. In 1867, the RLDS Church published the first edition of the IV and obtained a copyright for it. The RLDS Church, now known as Community of Christ, publishes the Inspired Version of the Holy Scriptures through the Herald House, its publishing arm. The copyright has expired on the 1867 edition and a bound photo reproduction of that edition is published by a private concern. In 1944, the RLDS Church issued a "new corrected edition" that eliminated some of the errors made in the original 1867 edition.

In 2024, the Community of Christ transferred ownership of the original manuscripts and Bible used in the Joseph Smith Translation to the Church of Jesus Christ of Latter-day Saints as part of a $192.5 million acquisition of historic sites, documents, and objects.

Today, Herald Publishing House, Community of Christ's publishing arm, sells both the Inspired Version and the NRSV. Community of Christ considers the NRSV to be a "good, recent translation". More recently, Community of Christ has adopted the New Revised Standard Version Updated Edition (NRSVue) for use in English-language resources. Noting the dependence of the Inspired Version on the King James Version, the basis of the King James Version on a relatively small number of relatively late source manuscripts, and the lack of support for Joseph Smith's changes in older Biblical manuscripts which have since been discovered, Community of Christ theology and scripture consultants Charmaine and Tony Chvala-Smith suggest understanding the Inspired Version as a work of theological commentary by Joseph Smith rather than as a restoration of the original autograph texts.

== Scholarship on JST/IV manuscripts ==
Because LDS scholars had not yet had an opportunity to compare the RLDS Church's 1944 IV edition to the original manuscripts, its initial acceptance by LDS Church members was limited. Beginning in the 1960s, explorations of the textual foundations of the JST/IV began in earnest with the pioneering work of the CofC scholar Richard P. Howard and the LDS scholar Robert J. Matthews. Matthews's summary of an exhaustive study corroborated the RLDS claims that the 1944 and subsequent editions of JST/IV constituted a faithful rendering of the work of Smith and his scribes—insofar as the manuscripts were then understood. With painstaking effort over a period of eight years, and with the full cooperation of Community of Christ, a facsimile transcription of the original manuscripts of the JST/IV was published in 2004.

== Viewpoints within the LDS Church ==
The LDS Church initially viewed the RLDS-published Inspired Version with suspicion, and favoured the Authorized King James Version (KJV) over it, although this suspicion "rapidly faded" during the 1970s. Following polemics by J. Reuben Clark of the First Presidency in favour of the KJV and the Greek Textus Receptus, the KJV has been firmly established as the approved English-language bible of the LDS Church.

Today, the LDS Church describes the creation of the JST/IV as Smith dictating "inspired changes and additions to scribes." However, the LDS church accepts only a portion of the changes found in the JST/IV as canon. Joseph Smith–Matthew and the Book of Moses, containing translations and revelatory expansions of Matthew 24 and Genesis 1–7, respectively, are contained in the LDS Pearl of Great Price; thus, they are the only portions of the JST/IV that the LDS Church has canonized as part of its standard works. Additionally, over 600 of the more doctrinally significant verses from the translation are included as excerpts in the current LDS Church edition of the KJV. This step has ensured an increase in the JST/IV's use and acceptance in the LDS Church today. A 1974 editorial of the LDS Church-owned Church News stated:

"The Inspired Version does not supplant the King James Version as the official Church version of the Bible, but the explanations and changes made by the Prophet Joseph Smith provide enlightenment and useful commentary on many biblical passages."

Regarding the JST/IV, Bruce R. McConkie (1915–1985) of the Quorum of the Twelve Apostles said, "The Joseph Smith Translation, or Inspired Version, is a thousand times over the best Bible now existing on earth".

Some Mormon scholars argue that the term "translation" was broader in meaning in 1828 than it is today, and Smith's work was at the time considered a revision of the English text, rather than a translation between languages; one of "ideas rather than language". It is known that Smith had not studied Hebrew or Greek to produce the JST/IV manuscript, although Smith did later study Hebrew from 1836 on.

LDS scholar Royal Skousen discusses whether one should assume that every change made in the JST/IV constitutes revealed text. Besides arguments that can be made from the actual text of the JST/IV, there are questions regarding the reliability and degree of supervision given to the scribes who were involved in transcribing, copying, and preparing the text for publication. Differences are also apparent in the nature of the revision process that took place at different stages of the work. For example, while a significant proportion of the Genesis passages that have been canonized as the Book of Moses "[look] like a word-for-word revealed text," evidence from a study of two sections in the New Testament that were revised twice indicates that the later "New Testament JST is not being revealed word-for-word, but largely depends upon Joseph Smith's varying responses to the same difficulties in the text."

== See also ==
- Biblical inerrancy
- LDS edition of the Bible

== Sources ==
- Smith, J. (1970). Joseph Smith's "New Translation" of the Bible Herald Publishing House; ISBN 0-8309-0032-2 (all J.S. changes or additions to King James version shown in parallel columns, but not the complete Bible)
- Matthews, R.J. (1985). "A Plainer Translation:" Joseph Smith's translation of the Bible – a history and commentary. Provo, UT: Brigham Young University Press. ISBN 0-8425-2237-9
- Millet, R.L. & Matthews, R.J. (1995). Plain and Precious Truths Restored: The doctrinal and historical significance of the Joseph Smith translation. Bookcraft. ISBN 0-88494-987-7
- Faulring, S.H., Jackson, K.P., & Matthews, R.J. [eds.] (2004). Joseph Smith's New Translation of the Bible: Original manuscripts. Provo, UT: BYU Religious Studies Center. ISBN 1-59038-328-1
- Nyman, Monte S.; Millet, Robert L. (1985). The Joseph Smith Translation: The restoration of plain and precious things. Religious Studies Center. Religious Studies Center Monograph Series. Vol. 12. Provo, UT: Brigham Young University. ISBN 0-88494-562-6.
