= JSA =

JSA may refer to:

- Jaden space Associations
- Japan Shogi Association
- Japan Sumo Association
- Japanese School of Amsterdam
- Japanese Standards Association
- JavaScript for Automaton, a scripting language for macOS
- Jetstar Asia (ICAO Code)
- Job Safety Analysis
- Job Services Australia
- Jobseeker's Allowance in the United Kingdom
- Joint sales agreement
- Joint Security Area a place between South and North Korea where the two country forces stand face-to-face.
- Joint Security Area (film), a 2000 South Korean film by Park Chan-wook
- Joseph Smith Academy, a campus of Brigham Young University once located in Nauvoo, Illinois
- Justice and Spirituality Association, or Al Adl Wa Al Ihssane, a Moroccan reformist organization
- Junior State of America, a student run political debate organization
- Justice Society of America, a DC Comics superhero team
  - JSA (comic book), a comic book title from DC Comics
- Js^{a}, a blood antigen
- Jefferson Science Associates, the non-profit managing and operating contractor of the Thomas Jefferson National Accelerator Facility
