= Book of Moses =

Part of the scriptural canon of the LDS movement

The Book of Moses, dictated by Joseph Smith, is part of the scriptural canon for some denominations in the Latter Day Saint movement. The book begins with the "Visions of Moses", a prologue to the story of the creation and the fall of man (Moses chapter 1), and continues with material corresponding to the Joseph Smith Translation of the Bible's (JST) first six chapters of the Book of Genesis (Moses 2–5, 8), interrupted by two chapters of "extracts from the prophecy of Enoch" (Moses chapters 6–7).

The Book of Moses begins with Moses speaking with God "face to face" and seeing a vision of all existence. Moses is initially overwhelmed by the immensity of the cosmos and humanity's smallness in comparison, but God then explains that he made the earth and heavens to bring humans to eternal life. The book subsequently provides an enlarged account of the Genesis creation narrative, which describes God having a corporeal body, followed by a rendering of the fall of Adam and Eve in celebratory terms that emphasizes eating the forbidden fruit as part of a process of gaining knowledge and becoming more like God. The Book of Moses also expands the story of Enoch, described in the Hebrew Bible as being an ancestor of Noah. In the expanded narrative, Enoch has a theophany in which he discovers that God is capable of sorrow, and that human sin and suffering cause him to grieve. Enoch then receives a prophetic calling, and he eventually builds a city of Zion so righteous that it is taken to heaven. Enoch's example inspired Smith's own hopes to establish the nascent Church of Christ as a Zion-esque community. The book also elaborates on passages that—in the view of Christians—foreshadowed the coming of Jesus, leading to explicit Christian doctrine of and faith in Jesus as a savior figure—effectively Christianizing the Hebrew Bible (Old Testament).

Portions of the Book of Moses were originally published separately by the Church of Jesus Christ of Latter-day Saints (LDS Church) in 1851, but later combined and published as the Book of Moses in the Pearl of Great Price, one of the four books of its canon. The same material is published by the Community of Christ as parts of its Doctrine and Covenants and Inspired Version of the Bible.

== Origin ==
In June 1830, Joseph Smith began a new translation of the Bible into English that was intended to restore "many important points touching the salvation of men, [that] had been taken from the Bible, or lost before it was compiled." The chapters that now make up the Book of Moses were first published in the church newspapers Evening and Morning Star and Times and Seasons in the 1830s and 1840s.

=== Publication by the Church of Jesus Christ of Latter-day Saints ===
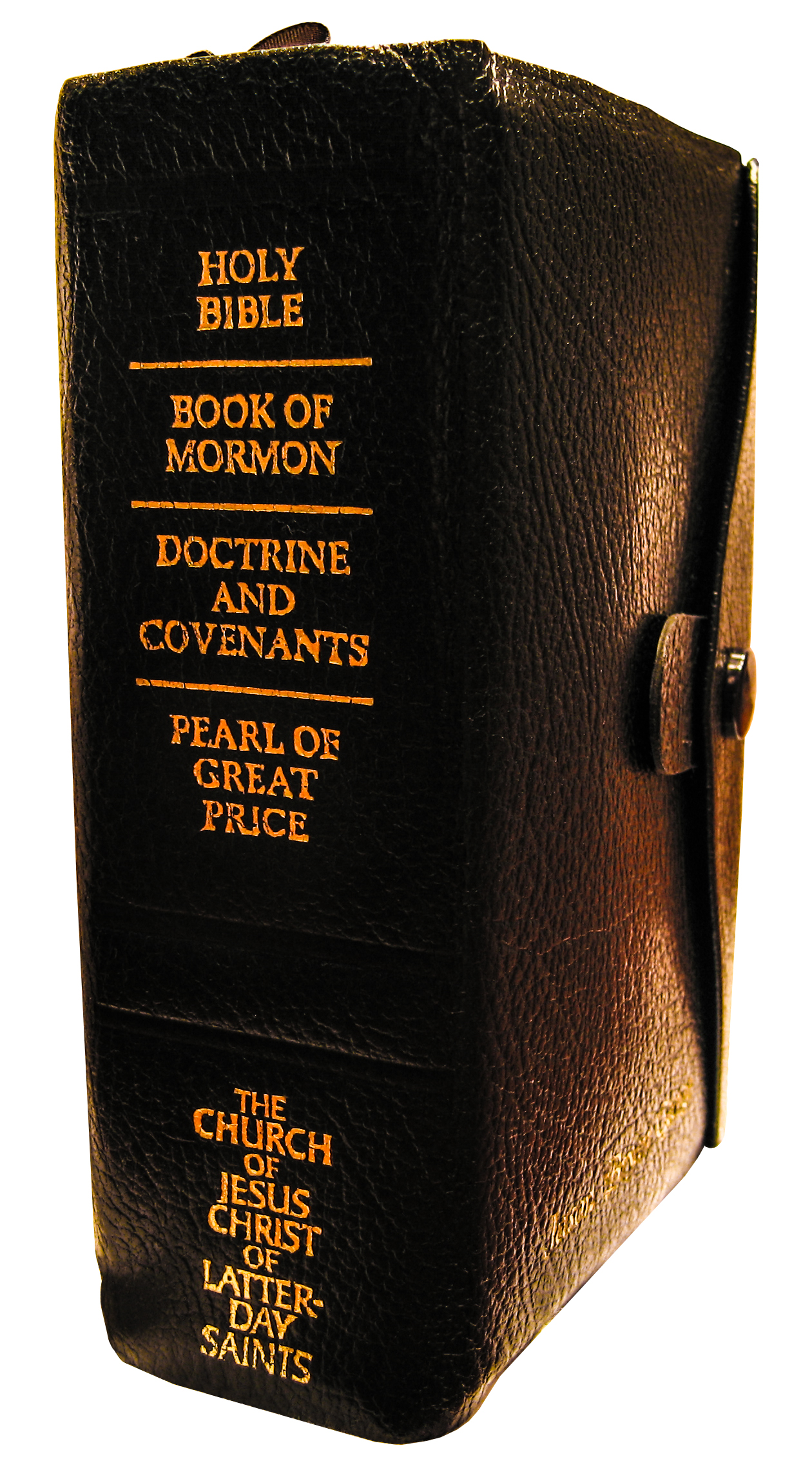
The Standard Works constitute the LDS Church scriptural canon

The Book of Moses is considered part of the Standard Works, which constitute the scriptural canon of the Church of Jesus Christ of Latter-day Saints (LDS Church). The eight chapters of the Book of Moses were included as a separate book within the Pearl of Great Price through a series of events subsequent to Smith's death. Franklin D. Richards, who published the first edition of the Pearl of Great Price in 1851, only had access to the early versions of the JST found in church newspapers along with another incomplete handwritten part of JST Genesis, not the original manuscripts. For this reason the Book of Moses ended abruptly in the middle of the story of Noah. Richards published everything he had at the time, and what is now the Book of Moses was later added by Orson Pratt in the 1878 edition of the Pearl of Great Price. The Pearl of Great Price, including the Book of Moses, was officially canonized by the LDS Church in 1880.

=== Publication by the Community of Christ ===
The Community of Christ, formerly known as the Reorganized Church of Jesus Christ of Latter Day Saints (RLDS Church), began publishing portions of the Book of Moses in its canonical Doctrine and Covenants (D&C) in 1864. Section 22 of the D&C contains Moses chapter 1, and section 36 contains Moses chapter 7. The inclusion of these excerpts in the Doctrine and Covenants was officially approved by the RLDS Church in 1970.

The RLDS Church began publishing the complete Joseph Smith Translation of the Bible in 1867 (giving it the name "The Holy Scriptures" and more commonly known as the "Inspired Version"); the portions of the Book of Moses that are not contained in the church's D&C are contained within this larger translation.

== Synopsis and ancient parallels ==
=== Moses 1 ===
- Moses 1: The events described in Moses 1 are portrayed as taking place sometime after Jehovah spoke to Moses out of the burning bush but before Moses had returned to Egypt to deliver the children of Israel (See Exodus 4:27). The details of Moses' experience in chapter 1 place it squarely in the tradition of ancient "heavenly ascent" literature (e.g., the pseudepigraphal Apocalypse of Abraham) and its relationship to temple theology, rites, and ordinances. Following a brief prologue, Moses is given a description of God's majesty and a confirmation of the work to which he had previously been foreordained as a "son of God." He is then shown the "world upon which he was created" and "all the children of men which are, and which were created." Then, having gone out the presence of God and no longer being clothed with His glory, Moses falls to the earth. He is then left to himself to be tested in a dramatic encounter with Satan. Having banished Satan through the power of the Only Begotten, Moses is "filled with the Holy Ghost." He "calls upon the name of God" in prayer, and is answered by a voice enumerating specific blessings. While "the voice is still speaking", Moses beholds every particle of the earth and all of its inhabitants. The culminating sequence begins in verse 31 when Moses, having continued to inquire of the Lord, returns to his presence. God then speaks with Moses face to face, describing his purposes for this earth and its inhabitants ("this is my work and my glory: to bring to pass the immortality and eternal life of man" Moses 1:39). Finally, the chapter closes with an allusion referring to Smith's restoration of the lost words of scripture (echoing a similar prophecy in the pseudepigraphal 2 Enoch 35:1–2), and stating that these words are to be shown only to those that believe (paralleling the pseudepigraphal 4 Ezra 14:6, 45–47). Then follows a vision outlining the creation, the fall of man, and subsequent events in the lives of Adam and Eve and their descendants. LDS scholars, this is consistent with ancient Jewish sources which affirm that Moses saw these events in vision.

=== Moses 2–8 ===
Moses 2–8 generally follow the first chapters of the Book of Genesis, but often provide alternative interpretations of the text or significant additional detail not found in the Bible. Among the notable differences are the following:

- Moses 2 (cf. Genesis 1): A brief prologue affirming that the account derives from the words of God directly to Moses is added in verse 1. The repetition of the phrase "I, God" throughout the chapter also emphasizes the purported firsthand nature of the account. The idea that all things were created "by mine Only Begotten" (i.e., Jesus Christ, in his premortal state) is made clear, as is the Son's identity as the co-creator at the time when God said "Let us make man." Otherwise, the structure and basic premises of the Genesis account of the Creation are left intact. While following generally similar schemas, the two later versions of the creation story, given in the Book of Abraham and in the temple endowment, contain additional changes.
- Moses 3 (cf. Genesis 2): The Book of Moses explains the meaning of verse 5 in terms of the LDS idea of a spiritual creation. God explains that He: "created all things … spiritually, before they were naturally upon the face of the earth. For I, the Lord God, had not caused it to rain upon the face of the earth. And I, the Lord God, had created all the children of men; and not yet a man to till the ground; for in heaven created I them; and there was not yet flesh upon the earth, neither in the water, neither in the air (additions italicized). (Note: see also vv. 7, 9) Consistent with this concept, some ancient sources assert that the heavenly hosts—variously described as including the angels, the sons of God, and/or the souls of humanity—were part of the light that appeared on day one of creation. Verse 17 is expanded in a way that reinforces the LDS teaching that Adam and Eve were placed in a situation where they were required to exercise freedom of choice in order to continue their progression through the experience of earth life (Note: "But of the tree of the knowledge of good and evil, thou shalt not eat of it, nevertheless, thou mayest choose for thyself, for it is given unto thee; but, remember that I forbid it, for in the day thou eatest thereof thou shalt surely die.") As in the Quran, the transgression of Adam and Eve that led to their coming to earth is seen as a positive and necessary step that would provide the preparatory schooling they needed for an eventual glorious return to heaven.
- Moses 4 (cf. Genesis 3): Four verses are added to the beginning of the Genesis version of this chapter, interrupting the flow of the story to give an account of heavenly councils where the nature and purposes of creation were discussed and decided. These verses echo stories in Jewish midrash recording that God "took counsel with the souls of the righteous before creating the world". A summary of the story of Satan's fall from heaven is also given. Like the Quran, and in contrast to Genesis, the corresponding accounts of Satan's rebellion and Adam and Eve's fall form a "single, continuous story."
- Moses 5 (cf. Genesis 4): The Book of Moses adds fifteen verses to the beginning of the Genesis account. Verses 1–6 highlight the obedience of Adam and Eve by enumerating their faithfulness to each of the commandments they had been given. Adam and Eve began to "till the earth, and to have dominion over all the beasts of the field, and to eat his bread by the sweat of his brow." Likewise Eve fulfilled the commission she had received in the Garden of Eden and "bare … sons and daughters, and they began to replenish the earth." Moreover, "Adam was obedient to the commandments of the Lord" to "offer the firstlings of their flocks" for "many days," despite the fact that he did not yet fully understand the reason why he had been thus commanded. The period of testing for Adam involving "many days" mentioned in the Book of Moses corresponds to the "testing" of the first couple described in pseudepigraphal accounts such as the Life of Adam and Eve. Also recalling parallels in these ancient stories is the book of Moses account of how Adam and Eve's enduring obedience is rewarded by the announcement of their redemption through the eventual sacrifice of the son of God (vv. 6–13). In light of this extended prologue extolling the virtue of obedience and the promise of redemption, the Book of Moses' expanded story of Cain's rebellion and murder of his brother Abel appears in even starker relief. Cain's murderous pact with Satan is portrayed as the foundation of "secret combinations" that later flourish among the wicked, and provide a plausible context for the more fragmentary Genesis account of Lamech's slaying of his rival. The chapter ends with the declaration that "all things were confirmed unto Adam, by an holy ordinance, and the Gospel preached, and a decree sent forth, that it should be in the world, until the end thereof."
- Moses 6 (cf. Genesis 5): Expansions in the early part of the chapter further describe the story of the righteous Seth. The "genealogy" of his descendants are said to be kept in a "book of remembrance." Jewish and Islamic sources describe a similar book, intended to preserve "the primordial wisdom of paradise for Adam and his generations" and also "the genealogy of the entire human race". Moses chapter 6 contains the story of the call and preaching of Enoch. Though the biblical account of Enoch's life occupies only two verses, his story fills most of chapter 6 and all of chapter 7 of the book of Moses. Extended accounts of the experiences of Enoch, which contain surprising parallels with the Book of Moses (particularly in Qumran's Enochic Book of Giants), also circulated widely in Second Temple Judaism and early Christianity. Some of the most significant resemblances in Moses chapter 6 are found not in 1 Enoch, but in related pseudepigrapha published after the death of Joseph Smith such as the Second Book of Enoch (first published at the end of the 19th century), 3 Enoch (first widely circulated translation was by Odeberg in 1928), but especially in the intriguing elaborations of the Qumranic Book of Giants (discovered in 1948). As an example of parallels with Second Book of Enoch and 3 Enoch, Moses 6:31 calls the 65-year-old Enoch a "lad" (the only use of this term in LDS scripture), corresponding to the somewhat puzzling use of this term to describe Enoch/Metatron in, e.g., 2 Enoch 10:4 and 3 Enoch 3:2, 4:2, and 4:10. Speaking of a reference to "lad" in the Second Book of Enoch, non-Mormon scholar Gary Anderson writes: "The acclamation of Enoch as 'lad' is curious .… It is worth noting that of all the names given Enoch, the title 'lad' is singled out as being particularly apt and fitting by the heavenly host." With regard to the Book of the Giants the parallels with the Enoch chapters in the Book of Moses are concentrated in a scant three pages of Qumran fragments. These resemblances range from general themes in the story line (secret works, murders, visions, earthly and heavenly books of remembrance that evoke fear and trembling, moral corruption, hope held out for repentance, and the eventual defeat of Enoch's adversaries in battle, ending with their utter destruction and imprisonment) to specific occurrences of rare expressions in corresponding contexts (the reference to the "wild man," the name and parallel role of Mahijah/Mahujah, and the "roar of the wild beasts").
- Moses 7: This chapter continues the story of Enoch's preaching, including a vision of the "Son of Man"—a favorite motif in pseudepigraphal Book of Parables in 1 Enoch (Note: See 46:2–4; 48:2; 60:10; 62:5, 7, 9, 14; 63:11; 69:26-27, 29; 70:1; 71:14, 17) that also appears in marked density throughout the Book of Moses vision of Enoch (Note: Moses 7:24, 47, 54, 56, 59, 65). "Chosen One" (Note: Moses 7:39. Cf. Moses 4:2. See 1 Enoch 39:6; 40:5; 45:3–4; 49:2, 4; 51:5a, 3; 52:6, 9; 53:6; 55:4; 61:5, 8, 10; 62:1) "Anointed One", (Note: i.e., Messiah. See Moses 7:63. Cf. 1 Enoch 48:10; 52:4) and "Righteous One" (Note: Moses 6:57; 7:45, 47, 67. Cf. 1 Enoch 38:2; 53:6. See also 39:6; 46:3; 49:2; 62:2–3) that appear prominently both in 1 Enoch and the LDS Enoch story. After considering the sometimes contentious debate among scholars about the single or multiple referent(s) of these titles and their relationship to other texts, Nickelsburg and VanderKam conclude that the author of 1 Enoch "saw the … traditional figures as having a single referent and applied the various designations and characteristics as seemed appropriate to him." Consistent with texts found at Nag Hammadi, Smith's Enoch straightforwardly equates the filial relationship between God and His Only Begotten Son in the New Testament to the Enochic notion of the perfect Man and the Son of Man: "Man of Holiness is [God’s] name, and the name of his Only Begotten is the Son of Man, even Jesus Christ, a righteous Judge, who shall come in the meridian of time" (Moses 6:57). The single specific description of the role of the Son of Man given in this verse from the book of Moses as a "righteous judge" is highly characteristic of the Book of the Parables within 1 Enoch, where the primary role of the Son of Man is also that of a judge (e.g., 1 Enoch 69:27. Cf. John 5:27)." In a vision of Enoch found in the book of Moses, three distinct parties weep for the wickedness of mankind: God (Moses 7:28; cf. v. 29), the heavens (Moses 7:28, 37), and Enoch himself (Moses 7:41, 49). In addition, the earth mourns for her children (Moses 7:48–49). This chorus of weeping is consistent with the ancient Enoch literature. Moses chapter 7 concludes with the story of how Enoch gathered the righteous into a city he called Zion that was taken to heaven, a story whose ancient parallels have been explored by David J. Larsen.
- Moses 8 (cf. Genesis 5-6): Additional details are given about the story of Methuselah and the preaching of Noah, again stressing the coming of Jesus Christ and the necessity of baptism. The term, "sons of God," as it occurs in the enigmatic episode of mismatched marriages in the Bible (Genesis 6:1) and relating to passages in 1 Enoch 6–7 about the "Watchers" has been the source of controversy among scholars. Contradicting traditions that depict these husbands as fallen angels, the Book of Moses (Moses 8:13–15) is consistent with early Christian traditions that portray them as mere mortals who lay claim on the title of sons of God by virtue of their priesthood (see Moses 6:64–68). The Book of Moses ends abruptly just before the flood of Noah, but the story continues in the remainder of the JST version of Genesis.

== Scholarship ==
In contrast to numerous scholarly analyses of Smith's purported translations of the Book of Mormon and the Book of Abraham that began to appear in the 19th century, explorations of the textual foundations of the JST began in earnest only in the 1960s, with the pioneering work of the RLDS scholar Richard P. Howard and the LDS scholar Robert J. Matthews. A facsimile transcription of all the original manuscripts of the JST was at last published in 2004. Among other studies of the JST, Brigham Young University Professor Kent P. Jackson, a longtime student of these topics, prepared a detailed study of the text of the portions of the JST relating to the Book of Moses in 2005.

Although several brief studies of the teachings of the Book of Moses had previously appeared as part of apologetic and doctrinally focused LDS commentaries on the Pearl of Great Price, the first detailed verse-by-verse commentary—and the first to incorporate significant amounts of modern non-LDS Bible scholarship—was published by Richard D. Draper, S. Kent Brown, and Michael D. Rhodes in 2005.

In his master's thesis, Salvatore Cirillo cites and amplifies the arguments of D. Michael Quinn that the available evidence that Smith had access to published works related to 1 Enoch has moved "beyond probability—to fact." He concludes that there is no other explanation than this for the substantial similarities that he finds between the Book of Moses and the pseudepigraphal Enoch literature. However, reflecting on the "coincidence" of the appearance of the first English translation of 1 Enoch in 1821, just a few years before Smith received his Enoch revelations, Richard L. Bushman concludes: "It is scarcely conceivable that Joseph Smith knew of Laurence's Enoch translation." Perhaps even more significant is the fact that the principal themes of "Laurence’s 105 translated chapters do not resemble Joseph Smith’s Enoch in any obvious way." Apart from the shared prominence of the Son of Man motif in the 1 Enoch Book of the Parables and the Book of Moses and some common themes in Enoch's visions of Noah, the most striking resemblances to Smith's writings are found not in 1 Enoch, but in Enochic literature published after the Smith's death. As an impressive example of such post-mortem resemblances, Cirillo cites (but does not provide any explanation of provenance) for the Mahujah/Mahijah character in Qumran Book of the Giants and the Book of Moses.

As an alternative explanation for the Mahujah/Mahijah name and role in the Book of Moses, Matthew Black formulated a hypothesis in a conversation reported by Mormon scholar Gordon C. Thomasson that "certain carefully clandestine groups had, up through the middle-ages, maintained, sub rosa, an esoteric religious tradition based in the writings of Enoch, at least into the time of and influencing Dante" and "that a member of one of the esoteric groups he had described previously must have survived into the 19th century, and hearing of Joseph Smith, must have brought the group’s Enoch texts to New York from Italy for the prophet to translate and publish."

John L. Brooke claims that Sidney Rigdon, among others, was a "conduit of Masonic lore during Joseph’s early years" and then goes on to make a set of claims connecting Mormonism and Masonry. These claims, including connections with the story of Enoch's pillars in Royal Arch Masonry, are disputed by Mormon scholars William J. Hamblin, et al. Non-Mormon scholar Stephen Webb agreed with Hamblin, et al., concluding that "actual evidence for any direct link between [Joseph Smith’s] theology and the hermetic tradition is tenuous at best, and given that scholars vigorously debate whether hermeticism even constitutes a coherent and organized tradition, Brooke’s book should be read with a fair amount of skepticism."

Some non-Mormon scholars have signaled their appreciation of the significance of the Smith's translation efforts in light of ancient documents. Yale University critic of secular and sacred literature Harold Bloom, who classes the Book of Moses and the Book of Abraham among the "more surprising" and "neglected" works of LDS scripture, is intrigued by the fact that many of their themes are "strikingly akin to ancient suggestions" that essentially restate "the archaic or original Jewish religion, a Judaism that preceded even the Yahwist." While expressing "no judgment, one way or the other, upon the authenticity" of LDS scripture, he finds "enormous validity" in the way these writings "recapture … crucial elements in the archaic Jewish religion … that had ceased to be available either to normative Judaism or to Christianity, and that survived only in esoteric traditions unlikely to have touched Smith directly." With respect to any possibility that Smith could have drawn from ancient manuscripts in his writings, Bloom concludes: "I hardly think that written sources were necessary." Stephen Webb concludes that Smith "knew more about theology and philosophy than it was reasonable for anyone in his position to know, as if he were dipping into the deep, collective unconsciousness of Christianity with a very long pen."

== Genealogy ==
The Book of Moses contains a detailed account of Adam's descendants. Genealogy from the Book of Abraham is shown below. Bold denotes individuals not from Genesis. The names Egyptus and Pharaoh are not present in the Book of Moses, but they are mentioned in the Book of Abraham, another book of Mormon scripture.

Adam	Eve
**son**	Cain	Abel	Seth
**daughter**	Enos
Enoch	Cainan
Irad	Mahalaleel
Mahujael	Jared
Methusael	Enoch
Adah	Lamech	Zillah	Methuselah
Jabal	Jubal	Tubal Cain	Naamah	Lamech
Noah
Japheth	Shem	Ham	**Egyptus**
**Egyptus**
**Pharaoh**

== See also ==
- Book of Jubilees
- Scrolls of Moses
- Bhagavata Purana

== Footnotes ==
Pearl of Great Price
Preceded by None	Pearl of Great Price	Succeeded by Abraham
