= LeRoy Davis White =

American politician

LeRoy Davis White (1888 – 1955) was a Democratic member of the Utah House of Representatives and mayor of Perry, Utah.

White was born in Perry, Utah where he lived most of his life. He was a farmer, banker and also involved in real estate transactions. He served as a member of the Utah House of Representatives. He was also mayor of Perry, Utah. He served as a ward bishop of the Church of Jesus Christ of Latter-day Saints for 11 years. White also served for a time as a member of the Box Elder County School board.

White was the father of Dentzel White, who married Russell M. Nelson, who eventually became a member of the Quorum of the 12 apostles of the Church of Jesus Christ of Latter-day Saints and after her death president of that Church.

== Sources ==
- Spencer J. Condie. Russell M. Nelson: Father, Surgeon, Apostle Salt Lake City: Deseret Book, 2003. Chapter 5.
