= George Durrant =

US author, educator, speaker (born 1931)

George Donald Durrant
- Born: October 20, 1931 (age 94); American Fork, Utah US
- Education: Brigham Young University (B.S., M.Ed., (Ed.D.)
- Occupations: Author, professional speaker, professor
- Spouse(s): Marilyn Burnham Durrant (died October 2011); Susan Easton Black (married in 2013)
- Website: georgedurrant.com

George Donald Durrant (born October 20, 1931) is a prominent member of the Church of Jesus Christ of Latter-day Saints (LDS Church). He has written or co-authored more than 50 books, been a university professor, worked in several positions in the LDS Church's educational system (CES), a motivational speaker, and an LDS Church employee (he served as Director of Priesthood Genealogy, and worked on the Family Home Evening improvement program). He taught religion at Brigham Young University (BYU).

== Biography and education ==
Durrant was born in American Fork, Utah. He served a mission for the LDS Church in England. He received a bachelor's degree from BYU in 1956, and later also received master's and doctorate degrees from BYU.

Durrant married Marilyn Burnham (1931–2011) in 1956 and they had eight children, including Devin Durrant, a former professional basketball player and LDS Church leader. Marilyn died in October 2011 and Durrant married Susan Easton Black in 2013.

Durrant was named Professor of the Year while teaching religion at BYU, and in a student poll was voted as one of the 15 most influential people at the university. He also taught at the church's Institute of Religion in Orem, Utah.

Durrant has been a senior consultant at the Covey Leadership Center.

In the LDS Church, Durrant served as president of the Kentucky Tennessee Mission from 1972 to 1975, and later as president of the Missionary Training Center in Provo, Utah. He also served a CES mission to Toronto, Ontario, Canada. Durrant and his wife, Susan, served a mission at the Nauvoo Illinois Temple (2013). As of January 2016, they had served several church service historical missions in St. George, Utah.

== Works ==
Books

- Someone Special: Starring YouTH (1976) (ISBN 0-88494-311-9)
- Love at Home, Starring Father (1976) (ISBN 0-88494-295-3)
- The Art of Raising Parents: A Young Person's Guide (1977) (ISBN 0-88494-332-1)
- Get Ready! Get Called! Go! (1979) (ISBN 0-88494-363-1)
- Love at Home Starring Father (1980) (ASIN B003HEXXX2)
- Illustrated Stories from the Bible (1981) (ISBN 0-911712-63-1)
- Fun & Names: Or, How to Dig Your Family History without Really Prying (1980) (ISBN 0-88494-392-5)
- There's an Enemy Sub in Potter's Pond (1981) (ISBN 0-88494-439-5)
- This Christmas I Hope You Don't Forget the Star (1982) (ISBN 0-88494-467-0)
- Mother: Our Heavenly Connection (1984) (ISBN 0-88494-523-5)
- The Art of Raising Parents (1985) (ASIN B003HF61JM)
- That Thine Alms May Be in Secret (1989) (ISBN 0-88494-711-4)
- My Best Day So Far (1990) (ISBN 0-88494-731-9)
- Never Alone (1991) (ISBN 0-88494-800-5)
- Upset at Rooster Creek (1991) (ISBN 1-56509-006-3)
- The Case of the Missing Ancestors (1991) (ISBN 1-56509-008-X)
- You and Your Spouse in Your Happy House (1992) (ISBN 0-88494-844-7)
- And the Winner Is ... Father! (1993) (ISBN 0-88494-886-2)
- Look at the Sky (1994) (ISBN 0-88494-925-7)
- Finding Your Mission in Life (1994) (ISBN 1-57008-093-3)
- Love at Home, Starring Grandpa (1995) (ISBN 1-57008-197-2)
- The Home Court Advantage (1995) (ISBN 1-57008-099-2)
- True to the Faith (1998) (ISBN 1-57008-469-6)
- FUNctional Families - Homemade Solutions for Happy Families (1999) (ISBN 1-57008-694-X)
- Family History for the Clueless (2000) (ISBN 1-57008-658-3)
- Illustrated Stories from The Book of Mormon (2000) (ASIN B003CET81Q)
- Scones for the Heart (2001) (ISBN 1-55517-593-7)
- Don't Forget the Star (2001) (ISBN 1-55517-594-5)
- Scones for the Heart: 184 inspiring morsels of wit and wisdom to warm the soul (2001) (ISBN 1-55517-593-7)
- Becoming the Bold Missionary (2002) (ASIN B0013KL0D2)
- Shakespeare's Best Work (2003) (ISBN 0-88494-925-7)
- The Lasting Convert (2003) (ASIN B0017ZNEZU)
- Becoming the Lasting Convert (2003) (ISBN 1-55517-690-9)
- A Touch of Christmas (2006) (ISBN 1-932898-62-X)
- 100 Character Traits of the Whole Hearted Missionary (2006) (ISBN 1-55517-897-9)
- Seven Years Old and Preparing for Baptism (2007)
- Great Dads and Grandfathers (2007) (ISBN 1-932898-71-9)
- A Glorious Future (2008) (ISBN 1-932898-90-5)
- Becoming a Priesthood Man (2009) (ISBN 1-59936-044-6)
- The Most Valuable Man: A Priesthood Leader in the Home (2010) (ISBN 1-59936-060-8)
- Becoming the Bold Missionary (2013) (ISBN 1-55517-673-9)

As co-author

- Turning Points (1981) (with Vaughn J Featherstone, Elaine A. Cannon, and Jack Weyland) (ISBN 0-88494-436-0)
- Keeping Score: A Novel (1983) (with Matthew B. Durrant) (ISBN 0-88494-506-5)
- Illustrated Stories from the Bible - Volumes 2- 10 (with Marilyn Durrant and Vernon Murdock)
- Bible Study Guide for Illustrated Stories from the Bible in Ten Volumes (with Millie Foster and Paul R. Cheesman) (ASIN B007FCUHZY)
- Tom Trails: A New Beginning (1986) (with Wayne B. Lynn) (ISBN 0-88494-589-8)
- The Christmas Marble (2004) (with Adam Ford) (ISBN 1-55517-824-3)
- I Will Make of Thee A Great Nation (2010) (with Val D. Greenwood and Owen Richardson) (ISBN 0-9826017-1-9)
- Rich on any Income: The Easy Budgeting System that Fits in Your Checkbook (2013) (with James P. Christensen and Clint Combs) (ISBN U-87579-009-7)

Audio book only (not in print)

- Someone Special Starring Everyone (1980)
- Pull With The Lord (1982)
- Be Thou A Masterful Teacher (1982)
- A Story That Must Be Told
- Best Meeting of All
- A Dad, a Boy, and a Ball (1988)
- A Letter to Lexie about Missionaries (1990)
- Families - A Long Line of Love (1996)
- Finding Direction In Your Life
- Helping
- I Am Special
- Have A Righteous Cause
- Number One Christian
- Seek Correct Answers
- Self Respect
- The Interview
- With the Tongues of Angels

Other

- Traveling the Backroad with George Durrant (Latter Day Digest, June 1994, Volume 3 No. 6) (1994)
- Sunshine for the Latter-Dayi Saint Woman's Soul (contributor) (1999) (ISBN 1-57008-655-9)
- Another Ray of Sunshine for the Latter-Day Saint Woman's Soul (contributor) (1999)
- Sharing Christmas: Stories for the Season (contributor)
- BYU speechL "Number One Christian" (July 20, 1976)
