= Bible Dictionary (LDS Church) =

Bible Dictionary is an official publication of the Church of Jesus Christ of Latter-day Saints (LDS Church). Since 1979, Bible Dictionary has been published as an appendix to most copies of the King James Version (KJV) of the Bible printed by the LDS Church. The dictionary contains 1285 entries on 196 pages. The publication states that it was "designed to provide teachers and students with a concise collection of definitions and explanations of items that are mentioned in or are otherwise associated with the Bible."

The LDS Bible Dictionary was created in the 1970s by the Scriptures Publications Committee of the LDS Church. This committee was chaired by Thomas S. Monson, then a member of the Quorum of the Twelve Apostles. The committee delegated the responsibility of creating an LDS bible dictionary to Robert J. Matthews, a Brigham Young University Professor of Ancient Scripture. Matthews gained permission from Cambridge University Press to use their bible dictionary as the template for the LDS version.

Matthews adjusted many of the entries to reflect LDS modifications of traditional Christian beliefs and also added a number of entries to address doctrines taught exclusively by the LDS Church. However, the majority of the content of the Bible Dictionary is identical to the Cambridge publication. The secretary of the committee was William James Mortimer.

The LDS Bible Dictionary is published in all English-language versions of the Bible printed by the church except for of the barebones KJV Bible distributed free of charge by Mormon missionaries. In other LDS-printed Bibles, it is found on pages 599 to 793 of the appendix materials, immediately following the Topical Guide and immediately preceding excerpts from the Joseph Smith Translation of the Bible. The LDS Church provides the complete contents of the Bible Dictionary online.

Despite being packaged with the LDS publication of the Bible, the Bible Dictionary is not part of the LDS Church's open canon of scripture. Its preface states, "It is not intended as an official or revealed endorsement by the Church of the doctrinal, historical, cultural, and other matters set forth."

== See also ==
- List of Bible dictionaries
