= Paul R. Cheesman =

American Mormon scholar

Paul Cheesman
- Born: Paul Robert Cheesman; May 31, 1921; Brigham City, Utah, U.S.
- Died: November 13, 1991 (aged 70); Utah, U.S.
- Spouse: Millie Foster
- Children: 6

Academic background
- Education: San Diego State University (BS); Brigham Young University (MEd, EdD)

Academic work
- Discipline: Education
- Sub-discipline: Religious education Mormon studies
- Institutions: Brigham Young University

Paul Robert Cheesman (May 31, 1921 – November 13, 1991) was an American academic and a professor of religion at Brigham Young University (BYU).

== Early life and education ==
Cheesman was born in Brigham City, Utah, a member of the Church of Jesus Christ of Latter-day Saints (LDS Church). His parents died while he was young and he oversaw his own education. He received a bachelor's degree in education from San Diego State University. He received his master's degree in 1965 and doctorate in 1967, both in religious education at Brigham Young University.

== Career ==
In California, he was also a public school teacher, and he later worked as a seminary teacher for the LDS Church. During the Korean War, he served as a chaplain in the United States Armed Forces.

Later, as president of the Foster Corporation, Cheesman was heavily involved in Central America, where he developed a collection and strong interest in pre-Columbian archaeology.

Cheesman taught in BYU's Department of Religious Education from 1963 to 1986. For a time, he served as director of scripture studies and director of Book of Mormon studies in BYU's Religious Studies Center. Cheesman was known for research of correlations between the Book of Mormon and pre-Columbian American discoveries. His stated desire was to promote Latter-day Saint faith:

Archaeological evidences which support The Book of Mormon do not convert, but we would hope that these thought-provoking discoveries might inspire and excite the reader to the point where they would want to study The Book of Mormon with real intent and gain a testimony of its truth.

Cheesman served in various callings in the LDS Church. He served as a Bishop, District president, twice as Stake president, and as president of the Louisiana Baton Rouge Mission from 1980 to 1983. After retiring from BYU, he was director of the church's New York Visitors Center.

== Personal life ==
In 1944, he married Millie Foster, with whom he had six children. After retiring, Cheesman and his wife moved to St. George, Utah. In New York, Cheesman suffered a massive heart attack and returned to Utah for surgery, when he died in 1991.

== Criticism ==
Cheesman's book Ancient American Indians: Their Origins, Civilizations and Old World Connections has been criticized as a poor work of scholarship, most especially by such men as Martin H. Raish and John L. Sorenson who also believe that the Book of Mormon is an ancient work and thus feel that such shoddy scholarship hurts more than it helps a true understanding of the book. William J. Hamblin has said of a 1985 work by Cheesman on ancient writing on gold plates that it should be "used with caution".

== Publications ==
Cheesman's most recognized publications are about ancient America's relationship to the Book of Mormon. His master's thesis was notable for bringing to light the previously unknown 1832 account of the First Vision, Joseph Smith's first recorded account that dates to 1832.

- Cheesman, Paul R. (1965). An Analysis of the Accounts Relating Joseph Smith's Early Visions. [master's thesis]. Provo, Utah: Brigham Young University.
- —— (October 1966). "The Stone Box". Improvement Era. Salt Lake City, Utah: The Church of Jesus Christ of Latter-day Saints.
- —— (1967). A Cultural Analysis of the Nephite-Lamanite-Mulekite Civilizations From the Book of Mormon. [doctoral dissertation]. Provo, Utah: Brigham Young University.
- —— (November 1968). "Archaeology and the Book of Mormon". The Instructor. 103 (11). The Church of Jesus Christ of Latter-day Saints.
- —— (Winter 1969). "The Wheel in Ancient America". BYU Studies. 9 (2): 185–197.
- —— (Autumn 1972). "Ancient Writing in the Americas". BYU Studies. 13 (1): 80–90.
- —— (1973). The Keystone of Mormonism: Little Known Truths About the Book of Mormon. Salt Lake City, Utah: Deseret Book.
- —— (1974). These Early Americans: External Evidences of the Book of Mormon. Salt Lake City, Utah: Deseret Book.
- Cheesman, Paul R. (Commentator); W.O. Whitaker (Producer); Millie Foster Cheesman (Writer); Scott Whitaker (Director) (1974). Ancient America Speaks (VHS). Brigham Young University and the Church of Jesus Christ of Latter-day Saints.
- ——; Cheesman, Millie Foster (1975). Early America and the Polynesians. Provo, Utah: Promised Land Publications.
- —— (1978). The World of the Book of Mormon. Salt Lake City, Utah: Deseret Book. ISBN 978-0-87747-649-8.
- —— (October 1979). "Ancient Writing on Metal Plates". Ensign. Salt Lake City, Utah: The Church of Jesus Christ of Latter-day Saints.
- ——; Griggs, C. Wilfred, eds. (1984). Scriptures for the Modern World. Religious Studies Monograph Series. Vol. 11. Provo, Utah: Religious Studies Center, BYU. ISBN 978-0-88494-538-3.
- ——; Hutchins, Barbara W. (1984). Pathways to the Past: A Guide to the Ruins of Mesoamerica. Bountiful, Utah: Horizon Publishers. ISBN 978-0-88290-236-4.
- —— (1985). Ancient Writings on Metal Plates. Bountiful, Utah: Horizon Publishers.
- —— (1988). "Lehi's Journeys". The Book of Mormon: First Nephi, The Doctrinal Foundation. Provo, Utah: Religious Studies Center, BYU.
- —— (1988). "Cultural Parallels between the Old World and the New World". The Book of Mormon: The Keystone Scripture. Provo, Utah: Religious Studies Center, BYU.
- ——; Cheesman, Millie F. (1991). Ancient American Indians: Their Origins, Civilizations and Old World Connections. Bountiful, Utah: Horizon Publishers.
- —— (1992). "Helaman _{2}". Encyclopedia of Mormonism. New York: Macmillan. Archived from the original on 2009-02-10.
- —— (1992). "Book of Mormon: Book of Helaman". Encyclopedia of Mormonism. Vol. 1. New York: Macmillan. Archived from the original on 2009-06-04.

=== Illustrated books ===
- Cheesman, Paul R.; Heimdal, Stuart; Jacobs, Raymond H.; Larson, Clinton F.; Revill, Joseph N. (1967–72). Illustrated Stories From the Book of Mormon. [16 vols.] Salt Lake City, Utah: Promised Land Publications.
- ——; Cheesman, Millie Foster; Heimdal, Stuart (1970). Great Leaders of the Book of Mormon. Salt Lake City, Utah: Promised Land Publications.
- ——; Patch, Robert C.; Heimdal, Stuart (1972). Illustrated Stories About the New Testament. [16 vols.] Salt Lake City, Utah: Promised Land Publications.
- —— (1972). Early America and the Book of Mormon: A Photographic Essay of Ancient America. Salt Lake City, Utah: Deseret Book. ISBN 978-0-87747-470-8.
- ——; Larry C. Porter; Vernon Murdock; Stuart Heimdal; LaMar C. Berrett; Billings Brown (1973). Illustrated Stories From Church History. [16 vols.] Provo, Utah: Promised Land Publications.
- ——; Hudson, Blaine T. (1978). Book of Mormon Lands: A Photographic Essay. Salt Lake City, Utah: Blaine Hudson Printing.
