= Roger P. Minert =

Author of books on German genealogy

Roger P. Minert was a professor of family history at Brigham Young University (BYU) until he retired in 2019. He is a professional genealogist and an emeritus AG (Accredited Genealogist). He has a background in German language study and has published reference books for genealogy work on German immigrants, guides on performing German genealogy research, and books about the history of the Church of Jesus Christ of Latter-day Saints in Germany. He frequently presents on German family history topics at genealogy conferences.

== Early life ==
Roger P. Minert was born in Nebraska. He lived in West Germany and Austria from the time he was 19 to the time he was 23.

== Career ==
Minert studied German at BYU in 1975, and graduated with his BA in 1977. He taught German at Box Elder High School until 1982, when he started working as a financial analyst for Morton-Thiokol. In 1987 he earned an MA in German literature from Ohio State University, and in 1987, 1988, and 1990, he was the assistant coordinator of undergraduate instruction in Ohio State's German program. From 1988–1990 he taught German at Ohio Wesleyan University and supervised student teachers at Ohio State. In 1991 he earned a PhD in German language history and acquisition from the Ohio State University. His thesis was entitled "The influence of student-identified factors on enrollment in foreign language courses in public high schools in the United States."

Starting in 1991, Minert worked as an independent professional genealogist with accreditation from the Salt Lake Family History Library for Germany (1992) and Austria (1993). He has over 36,000 hours of experience doing family history research in archives in the United States, Austria, and Germany. In 2003 he was hired as a professor of family history at BYU. In 2011 and 2013 he directed BYU's study abroad programs to Vienna, Austria. His is the director of a research project called "German immigrants in American church records," a project to extract genealogical data from German-American church records across America and publish them in books.

Minert has written more than 120 books and articles about German family history research and how to teach the German language. His research focuses on family history research, especially among Germans and German immigrants. In one study, he found that local church records were most likely to have records of the birthplaces of German immigrants in the United States. Federal census records were the least likely to give birthplace records of German immigrants, and naturalization records gave birthplaces only ten percent of the time. Minert's Deciphering Handwriting in German Documents: Analyzing German, Latin, and French in Vital Records Written in Germany is often recommended as a reference for deciphering German vital records.

== Conference presentations ==
Minert has presented at various genealogy conferences. In 2008 he presented to the National Genealogical Society about status in Germany 1500–1800 from a research perspective. In 2011, he presented on finding German ancestors to the Sacramento German Genealogy Society. He was also a featured speaker in 2013 and 2015. Minert presented on pre-1871 German census records at the 2016 RootsTech conference. He also presented at the International Germanic Genealogy Conference in 2017, which described him as a "well-known international person" in genealogy.

== Awards ==
In 2010, Minert's book In Harm's Way: East German Latter-day Saints in World War II won the Geraldine McBride Woodward Award from the Mormon History Association for best international book. The book was published by the Religious Studies Center at BYU and is available online. In a review for Contemporary Church History Quarterly, John S. Conway described In Harm's Way: East German Latter-day Saints in World War II as highly detailed, explaining that Minert interviewed 500 surviving church members from this time period for the book. Conway wrote that the book is "church history from the pew upwards, but is outstanding as an example of meticulous record-keeping."

== Selected works ==
=== Articles/chapters ===
- Minert, Roger P. (1987). "Tools for the Classroom. Gaining a Firm Foothold on the Map: Another Approach to the Study of German Geography". Unterrichtspraxis. 20 (1). doi:10.2307/3530518. JSTOR 3530518.
- — (1987). The Liedermacher Reinhard Mey : his songs, their themes, and their reception (MA). Ohio State University. OCLC 17424070.
- Minert, Roger P. (May 1991). "The Language Bowl: Theory and Practice". Foreign Language Annals. 24 (3): 183–191. doi:10.1111/j.1944-9720.1991.tb00462.x.
- — (1991). The influence of student-identified factors on enrollment in foreign language courses in public high schools in the united states (PhD). Ohio State University. OCLC 25172281. ProQuest 303943067.
- — (2009). "More like this Subjects Church of Jesus Christ of Latter-day Saints – Germany (East) – History. World War, 1939–1945. Church of Jesus Christ of Latter-day Saints. View all subjects Similar Items The fate of the LDS East German mission home in World War II". Mormon Historical Studies. 10 (1). OCLC 505050525.
- — (2010). "German and Austrian Latter-day Saints in World War II: an analysis of casualties and losses". Mormon Historical Studies. 11 (2).
- — (2011). "25. Succession in German Mission Leadership during World War II". In Whitaker, David; Garr, Arnold (eds.). A Firm Foundation: Church Organization and Administration. Religious Studies Center, Brigham Young University.
- — (2014). "Spires and sycamores: the Brigham City Temple controversy". Mormon Historical Studies. 15 (1). ISSN 1535-1750.
- —; Leishman, Anne (2015). "What We Should Teach the Latter-day Saints about Family History and Genealogy". Religious Educator. 16 (2).

=== History books ===
- Minert, Roger P. (1992). German name geography for genealogists. Columbus, OH: R.P. Minert.
- — (2000). Gerhard Henrich Meinert: his ancestors and his descendants. GRT Publications.
- — (2000). The Rauth Family: from Bavaria to Galicia to the United States. Woods Cross, Utah: GRT Publications.
- — (2009). In harm's way: East German Latter-day Saints in World War II. Provo, Utah: Religious Studies Center, Brigham Young University. ISBN 978-0-8425-2746-0.
- — (2011). Under the gun: West German and Austrian Latter-day Saints in World War II. Provo, Utah: The Religious Studies Center, Brigham Young University. ISBN 978-0-8425-2798-9.
- — (2015). Against the Wall: Johann Huber and the First Mormons in Austria. Provo, Utah: Religious Studies Center, Brigham Young University. ISBN 978-0-8425-2933-4. Archived from the original on 2017-11-08.

=== Family history guides ===
- Riemer, Roger; Riemer, Shirley J. (2001). Researching in Germany: a handbook for your visit to the homeland of your ancestors. Sacramento, CA: Lorelei Press. ISBN 9780965676151.
- Riemer, Shirley J.; Minert, Roger P.; Anderson, Jennifer A. (2010). The German research companion. Sacramento, California: Lorelei Press.
- — (2013). Deciphering handwriting in German documents: analyzing German, Latin, and French in historical manuscripts (Second ed.). ISBN 9780971690691.
- — (2016). German census records, 1816–1916 : the when, where, and how of a valuable genealogical resource. Orting, WA: Family Roots. ISBN 9781628590784.

=== Website ===
rogerpminert.com
