= Religious Studies Center =

Center at Brigham Young University

- Established: 1975; 51 years ago
- Publications Directors: Gaye Strathearn (2026–); Jared W. Ludlow (2021–2026); Scott C. Esplin (2018–2021); Thomas A. Wayment (2013–2018); Dana M. Pike (2012–2013); Robert L. Millet (2010–2012); Richard N. Holzapfel (2004–2010); Richard D. Draper (2001–2004); Kent P. Jackson (1994–2001); Charles D. Tate Jr. (1987–1994); S. Kent Brown (1985–1987)
- Address: 1063 Joseph F. Smith Building; Provo, Utah 84602
- Location: Brigham Young University
- Website: https://rsc.byu.edu/

The Religious Studies Center (RSC) at Brigham Young University (BYU) sponsors and publishes scholarship on the culture, history, scripture, and doctrine of the Church of Jesus Christ of Latter-day Saints (LDS Church).

== History ==
The RSC (sometimes called the Center for Religious Studies in its early years) was founded in 1975 by Jeffrey R. Holland, dean of Religious Education at BYU. Upon the recommendation of BYU president Dallin H. Oaks, the establishment of the RSC was approved by BYU's Board of Trustees in early 1976. Holland became the RSC's first director, with Keith H. Meservy, assistant professor of ancient scripture, as administrator. In 1976, Holland was appointed Commissioner of Church Education, and Ellis T. Rasmussen replaced him as dean of Religious Instruction and general director of the RSC.

The RSC brought together several earlier BYU institutions. It became the home of the Richard L. Evans Chair of Christian Understanding, which had been founded in 1973 with Truman G. Madsen as its first occupant. Madsen became a professor emeritus in 1994, and the position was renamed the Richard L. Evans Chair of Religious Understanding, reflecting the hope that holders would extend the hand of friendship to all people, not just Christians. The RSC also assumed and expanded upon the activities of the Institute of Mormon Studies, which was founded to study Mormon history and doctrine under Daniel H. Ludlow in 1961 and Madsen in 1966. Likewise, the RSC absorbed the Book of Mormon Institute, a center for research on the Book of Mormon, with Ludlow as its first director in 1965, followed by Paul R. Cheesman in 1968.

In September 1985, at the request of Holland, then BYU's president, the RSC began holding annual symposia on the Book of Mormon. The first of these was organized by Paul R. Cheesman, who also edited the published compilation of papers from that event. Each symposium successively covered following sections of the book until 1994, when papers on the entire book had been published in nine anthology volumes in the Book of Mormon Symposium Series.

In 2001 the dean of Religious Education, Andrew C. Skinner, asked Richard D. Draper to reorganize the center with Holzapfel as editor of the new Religious Educator journal and Devan Jensen as executive editor to professionalize the publications. The RSC created a new advisory board with male and female members from diverse backgrounds with interest in ancient scripture and modern history and doctrine of the LDS Church. Draper negotiated a partnership with Covenant Communications to publish RSC materials; that partnership lasted about five years. The Religious Educator relied on copyediting by Ted D. Stoddard and Devan Jensen with design work by Stephen Hales Creative, based in Provo, Utah. Holzapfel started a project to digitize past RSC content; initiated translation of selected articles into Spanish, Portuguese, and German; and launched the BYU Religious Education Review magazine. In 2024 supervision of the BYU Religious Studies Center transferred to Religious Scholarly Publications.

== Purpose ==
Believing that church leaders, not scholars, are the ultimate doctrinal authority, the RSC seeks only to add historical, cultural, and linguistic context and to explore new views of the LDS Church's religious tradition. The RSC coordinates and publishes this research in the hopes of growing the body of LDS literature and thought.

In 1977, as Church Commissioner of Education, Holland told the center that he hoped it would bring dialogue with other cultures and religions, leading to greater understanding, brotherhood, and peace. Later, as president of BYU in 1986, Holland recalled that the RSC was established to inform those within the university and the general LDS Church membership. In 2008, the RSC began posting its complete library in English and selections in Spanish and Portuguese in order to increase its worldwide presence.

== Activities ==
=== Areas of study ===
The RSC has funded research in several areas, including ancient scripture, ancient studies, the Bible, the Book of Mormon, Church history, the Doctrine and Covenants, Judeo-Christian Religions, the Pearl of Great Price, and world religions. The RSC has also sponsored LDS sociological studies and research on other religions, such as early Egyptian Christianity, Islam, and sub-tropical African religions. In 1985, the RSC began to publish works from some of these specialized areas of study, making up the RSC Specialized Monograph Series.

=== Research and funding ===
The RSC awards financial grants to BYU faculty and other scholars for research into LDS history, doctrine, scripture, and culture. This research has been published by the RSC and other publishers, including Dialogue: A Journal of Mormon Thought, the University of Illinois Press, the University of Missouri Press, and Oxford University Press. Of the several projects it accepts per year, the RSC prefers those that benefit religious teachers and the progress of the LDS Church. RSC publications are intended to be scholarly and useful to general LDS readers.

The RSC is financed through BYU funds, individual donations, and the Friends of Religious Education (FORE). FORE is a national volunteer committee to find donors for BYU Religious Education activities, such as RSC research, publishing, and translation. FORE encourages donations, sponsors projects, and hosts firesides (special religious lectures) throughout the United States given by Religious Education faculty.

=== Books ===
The following titles show the breadth of books published by the RSC (complete list): Andrew F. Ehat and Lyndon W. Cook, eds., The Words of Joseph Smith; Hugh W. Nibley, Nibley on the Timely and the Timeless; Kenneth L. Alford, ed., Civil War Saints; Roger P. Minert, In Harm's Way: East German Latter-day Saints in World War II; Mark L. Grover, A Land of Promise and Prophecy: Elder A. Theodore Tuttle in South America, 1960–1965; Laura Harris Hales, ed., A Reason for Faith: Navigating LDS Doctrine and Church History; and Michael Hubbard MacKay and Nicholas J. Frederick, Joseph Smith's Seer Stones. Several have won awards (see list below).

=== Symposia and Conferences ===
A primary function of the RSC is the organization of symposia and conferences on religious subjects, from which selected papers are later published. Anthologies from symposia on broad topics make up several volumes in the RSC Monograph Series. Some of these symposia recur annually, such as ones on scriptures and church history. The RSC is also involved with the annual Sidney B. Sperry Symposium, which have been held at BYU since 1973. Often, general authorities deliver the keynote addresses at these symposia.

In 2003 the Religious Education Administrative Council approved a proposal by Richard Holzapfel and Thomas Wayment to host a conference on the Saturday before Easter which would focus on Jesus's last twenty-four hours and Resurrection. The conference was held and rebroadcast on KBYU Television, helping Religious Education expand its audience. The response to this conference, now called the BYU Easter Conference, was so positive that BYU decided it should be an annual event, cosponsored by Religious Education and the RSC. Early on, nearly one thousand attendees heard D. Todd Christofferson give the keynote address at the second annual conference, "The Atonement and the Resurrection," later published in the Religious Educator. In subsequent years, the event was shifted to Fridays, often targeted to coincide with Good Friday. Over the years keynote addresses were delivered by BYU president Cecil O. Samuelson in 2006 F. Enzio Busche in 2007, and Bonnie D. Parkin in 2009. An estimated 2,500 people attended the 2013 Easter Conference that featured John M. Madsen, Brad Wilcox, and Brent L. Top. Other well-known keynote addresses have been given by Elaine S. Dalton, Spencer J. Condie, Sheri L. Dew, and BYU president, Kevin J Worthen. The annual event has stayed quite popular among people living along the Wasatch Front. The proceedings are published every other year by the RSC in cooperation with Deseret Book.

In 2006 the RSC began sponsoring the Church History Symposium, copublishing the proceedings with Deseret Book. Professor Alexander L. Baugh initiated the event by proposing a conference to acknowledge the two hundredth anniversary of Oliver Cowdery's birth. Since that time, this event has become a premier venue for rigorous and faithful scholarship on Church history. The topics have been Oliver Cowdery, Wilford Woodruff, John Taylor, "Preserving the History of the Latter-day Saints," "A Firm Foundation: Church Organization and Administration," "Go Ye into All the World: The Growth and Development of Mormon Missionary Work," "Joseph F. Smith: Reflections on the Man and His Times," "Approaching Antiquity: Joseph Smith's Study of the Ancient World," "The International Church: Mormonism as a Global Religion," "Beyond Biography: Sources in Context for Mormon Women's History," "Financing Faith: The Intersection of Business and Religion," and "Latter-day Saints and Religious Liberty: Historical and Global Perspectives.".

=== Periodicals ===
In addition to books and articles, the RSC publishes its own periodicals. In 1986 the RSC began publishing the quarterly (later bimonthly) Religious Studies Center Newsletter, which carried updates on RSC symposia, books, and research, and was distributed to Church Educational System faculty and LDS military chaplains. In 2008 the newsletter was replaced by BYU Religious Education Review, a semiannual magazine. In 2000, Dean Robert L. Millet and others created the Religious Educator journal to focus on "teaching the gospel, publishing studies on scripture, doctrine, and LDS Church history, and sharing the messages of outstanding devotional essays." Millet replaced the temporary editorial board in 2001 with Richard Neitzel Holzapfel, who became the full-time editor in chief. Holzapfel asked Ted D. Stoddard, a professor in the Marriott School of Business, to explore design and content issues and prepare guidelines that would enhance the scholarly basis of this new publication. Holzapfel clarified the purpose of this new venture: "Our hope is to provide readers with carefully prepared, inspirational, and information-packed writings on a wide range of subjects explicitly associated with the Restoration. Teachers, authors, researchers, and students of Latter-day Saint studies at every level will appreciate discussions of relevant ideas and issues from a perspective of faith." The main audience consists of Church Educational System teachers, such as volunteers and paid professionals in LDS Seminaries and Institutes of Religion and religion professors at church colleges. In 2007 the RSC agreed to oversee and help fund the student journal Studia Antiqua.

=== Awards ===
- 2022: Harvey B. and Susan Easton Black Outstanding Publication Award for Aaron P. Schade and Matthew L. Bowen, The Book of Moses: From the Ancient of Days to the Latter Days
- 2021: Latter-day Saint Publishing and Media Association Award for Anthony Sweat, Repicturing the Restoration: New Art to Expand Our Understanding
- 2021: Association for Mormon Letters Award (Criticism) for Anthony Sweat, Repicturing the Restoration: New Art to Expand Our Understanding
- 2019: Best International Book Award (Mormon History Association) for James A. Toronto, Eric R Dursteler, and Michael W. Homer, Mormons in the Piazza: History of the Latter-day Saints in Italy
- 2019: Harvey B. and Susan Easton Black Outstanding Publication Award (Gospel Scholarship, Ancient Scripture) for Ann M. Madsen and Shon D. Hopkin, Opening Isaiah: A Harmony
- 2019: Harvey B. and Susan Easton Black Outstanding Publication Award (Gospel Scholarship, Church History and Doctrine) for Richard Neitzel Holzapfel and David M. Whitchurch, My Dear Sister: Letters between Joseph F. Smith and Martha Ann Smith Harris
- 2018: Smith-Pettit Best Book Award (John Whitmer Historical Association) for Roy A. Prete and Carma T. Prete, eds., Canadian Mormons: History of the Church of Jesus Christ of Latter-day Saints in Canada
- 2018: Harvey B. and Susan Easton Black Outstanding Publication Award (Gospel Scholarship, Church History and Doctrine) for Fred E. Woods, Kalaupapa: The Mormon Experience in an Exiled Community
- 2017: Harvey B. and Susan Easton Black Outstanding Publication Award (Gospel Scholarship, Church History and Doctrine) for Michael Hubbard MacKay, Sacred Space: Exploring the Birthplace of Mormonism
- 2015: Harvey B. and Susan Easton Black Outstanding Publication Award (Church History and Doctrine, Gospel Scholarship) for Kip Sperry, Nauvoo and Hancock County, Illinois: A Guide to Family History and Historical Sources
- 2014: Harvey B. and Susan Easton Black Outstanding Publication Award (Ancient Scripture) for Daniel L. Belnap, ed., By Our Rites of Worship: Latter-day Saint Views on Ritual in Scripture, History, and Practice
- 2013: Harvey B. and Susan Easton Black Outstanding Publication Award (Church History and Doctrine) for Kenneth L. Alford, ed., Civil War Saints
- 2013: Best International Article Award (Mormon History Association) for Ronald E. Bartholomew, "The Role of Local Missionaries in Nineteenth-Century England," in Go Ye into All the World: The Growth and Development of Mormon Missionary Work, ed. Reid L. Neilson and Fred E. Woods
- 2012: Harvey B. and Susan Easton Black Outstanding Publication Award (Ancient Scripture) for Robert L. Millet, ed., No Weapon Shall Prosper: New Light on Sensitive Issues
- 2011: Geraldine McBride Woodward Award for Best Publication in International Mormon History (Mormon History Association) for Roger P. Minert, In Harm's Way: East German Latter-day Saints in World War II
- 2009: Geraldine McBride Woodward Award for Best Publication in International Mormon History (Mormon History Association) for Mark L. Grover, A Land of Promise and Prophecy: Elder A. Theodore Tuttle in South America, 1960–1965
- 2006: Steven F. Christensen Best Documentary Award (Mormon History Association) for Donald G. Godfrey and Kenneth W. Godfrey, The Diaries of Charles Ora Card: The Utah Years, 1871–1886
- 1993: T. Edgar Lyon Award of Excellence (Mormon History Association) for Ronald K. Esplin, "Discipleship: Brigham Young and Joseph Smith," in Joseph Smith, the Prophet, the Man, ed. Susan Easton Black and Charles D. Tate
- 1981: Distinction in Editing Mormon Documents (Mormon History Association) for Andrew Ehat and Lyndon Cook, The Words of Joseph Smith

== See also ==
- Neal A. Maxwell Institute for Religious Scholarship
