= Scott H. Faulring =

American historian

- Born: Scott Harry Faulring; August 11, 1956; Niagara Falls, New York, U.S.
- Died: June 29, 2018 (aged 61); Provo, Utah, U.S.
- Children: 4

Academic background
- Education: Brigham Young University (BA); Troy State University (MPA)

Academic work
- Discipline: History
- Sub-discipline: History of the Church of Jesus Christ of Latter-day Saints

Scott Harry Faulring (August 11, 1956 – June 29, 2018) is an American historian and editor specializing in the early history of the Church of Jesus Christ of Latter-day Saints (LDS Church). He has published with both the Foundation for Ancient Research and Mormon Studies and Signature Books.

== Early life and education ==
Faulring was born in Niagara Falls, New York. He joined the United States Air Force as a young man. Faulring became a member of LDS Church while stationed at the Francis E. Warren Air Force Base in Cheyenne, Wyoming.

Faulring received his bachelor's degree in history from Brigham Young University in 1983 and an MPA degree from Troy State University.

== Career ==
While serving in the Air Force, Faulring spent much of his time in Vogelweh, Germany, and İzmir, Turkey. He later returned to BYU as an instructor with the Air Force Reserve Officer Training Corps. After retiring from the Air Force, Faulring became a research historian with the Joseph Fielding Smith Institute for Church History.

=== Writings ===
One of his earliest projects was the publication of the journals of Joseph Smith, Jr. His commentary at times has been faulted for poor and misleading readings of the text, and his summary provided by Signature Books has been criticized for being overly harsh on Smith.

Faulring later wrote with Richard Lloyd Anderson a review of Todd Compton's In Sacred Loneliness, in which they jointly affirmed their faith in Smith as a prophet of God and criticized Compton's use of second-hand sources and even more heavily his use of the term polyandry.

Faulring has also edited a collection of documents on Oliver Cowdery and a book on the Joseph Smith Translation of the Bible. Faulring has also published material with the Mormon Historic Sites Foundation.
