= Nauvoo University =

Private Academic Institution

Nauvoo University was a private academic institution organized by members of the Church of Jesus Christ of Latter-day Saints (LDS Church) in Nauvoo, Illinois. It began operating in 2009 and ceased operating the following year.

== University of Nauvoo (1841–45) ==
After the Mormons had been expelled from Missouri, they crossed into Illinois and settled in Nauvoo in 1839. They were granted a city charter from the Illinois state legislature in December 1840, which included authorization to found a university. The school was founded in 1841 as the University of the City of Nauvoo, or the University of Nauvoo.

The University of Nauvoo ended after the 1844 murder of Joseph Smith, when the interest of many church leaders moved toward westward migration. It served as the inspiration for the Nauvoo University of 2009.

== Nauvoo University (2009-2010) ==
Nauvoo University was intended to be a reorganization of its 1840s predecessor. It took its mission statement from Joseph Smith's comment on the old university:

The University of the City of Nauvoo will enable us to teach our children wisdom—to instruct them in all knowledge, and learning, in the Arts, Sciences and Learned Professions. We hope to make this institution one of the great lights of the world, and by and through it, to diffuse that kind of knowledge which will be of practical utility, and for the public good, and also for private and individual happiness.

The school was specifically described as "not owned, operated, funded, or supported by the Church of Jesus Christ of Latter-day Saints," but like LDS Church-owned colleges, including Brigham Young University (BYU), and other LDS-related colleges such as Southern Virginia University, Nauvoo University promoted the moral standards of the LDS Church.

=== Board of trustees ===
The school drew interest from leaders and educators from the LDS community and the areas of Nauvoo, western Illinois, and southeastern Iowa. Its governing body was a 24-member Board of Trustees:

Name	Significance	Residence
Dell K. Allen	Technology professor at BYU and Utah State University and inventor	Logan, Utah
Charles Bair	Executive Director of the Western Illinois Economic Development Authority	Carthage, Illinois
Dr. Susan Easton Black	Noted lecturer and Professor of Church History, BYU	Provo, Utah
William Fillmore	Past associate general counsel for BYU and Attorney, FillmoreSpencer LLC	Utah
J. Phil Harrop	Executive Director, John Stoddard Cancer Center. BS from BYU; MBA, MHA from Ohio State University	Des Moines, Iowa
Dr. Evan L. Ivie	Manager at Bell Labs, BYU professor, and past Director of BYU-Nauvoo	Nauvoo, Illinois
Michael A. Kennedy	President of the Joseph and Emma Smith Association	Alpine, Utah
David F. King	CPA, founding partner of King, King, Alleman & Jensen	Nauvoo, Illinois
Dr. Clive D. Moon	Research chemist, chemistry professor and businessman, Nauvoo, University	
J. Samuel Park	Past president of the Nauvoo-Illinois Mission and Utah businessman	Salt Lake City, Utah
Hugh Pierce	Past mayor of Nauvoo, LDS Church leader and Nauvoo businessman	Nauvoo, Illinois
Dr. Anthony Piña	Dean at Sullivan University. BA and M.Ed. from BYU, Ed.D. from La Sierra University	Louisville, Kentucky
Vee Wilson	President of the Desert Valley Academy	Moapa, Nevada

=== First year and indefinite closure ===
The university opened in fall 2009, anticipating around 700 students and employees as faculty, administration, and staff. It organized as a 501(c)(3) non-profit institution.

Chris Benedict, one of the first students at the University, won the U.S. Cyber Challenge in Washington D.C. in December 2009.

Among the members of Nauvoo University's faculty as of summer 2010 was Clayne Robison, former director of BYU's Opera Program. His wife, Vivien Robison, who had been a part-time faculty member at BYU and sang in the Mormon Tabernacle Choir, was also on the faculty. Evan L. Ivie, who has a Ph.D. from MIT and was a professor of Computer Science at BYU for several years, was another early faculty member. Ivie had been director of the BYU Nauvoo program from 2002 until it was discontinued in 2006. Nauvoo University expected more retired professors would to come to teach in the city and local church members would assist in its beginnings.

In its first year, the university enrolled only 13 full-time and 6 part-time students. At the close of that year, Boyd K. Packer, representing LDS Church leadership, directed the organizers to shut down the university. He was dissatisfied with the venture and sought to maintain strict oversight of any organization using the ‘Nauvoo’ name or operating at historic church sites, in order to safeguard branding, manage risk, and control messaging.

Evan L. Ivie, one of the principal founders and a graduate of Stanford and MIT, was deeply disappointed by the decision. He regarded Packer’s reasoning as unreasonable and beyond his proper purview, since the university was not owned by the Church. The closure also had adverse effects on the Nauvoo economy, disrupting local hopes that the institution would bring growth and boost the economy of the community.

== See also ==
- Joseph Smith Academy
