= Susan Easton Black =

American historian

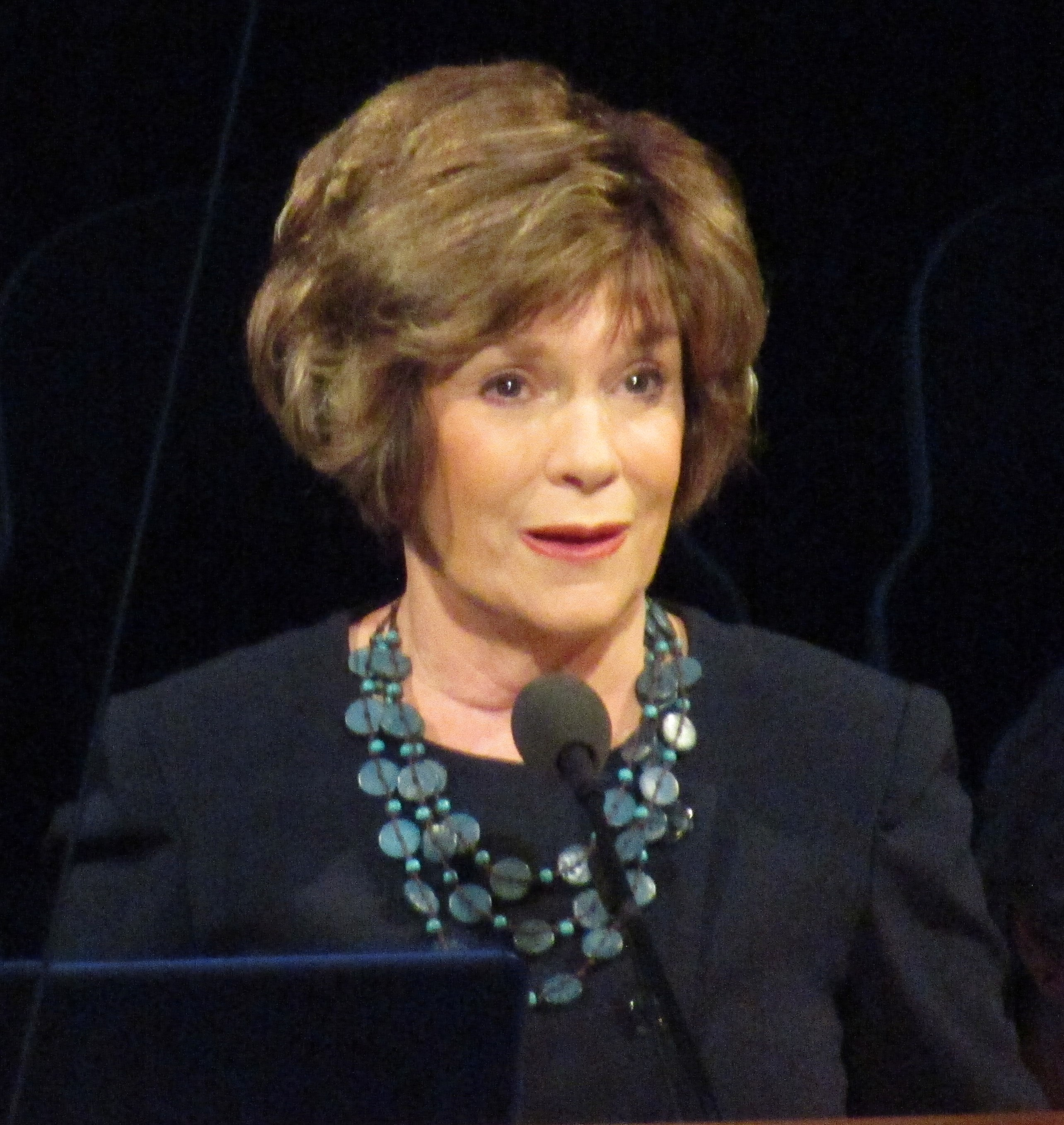
- Born: November 9, 1944 (age 81); Long Beach, California
- Education: Brigham Young University (Ed.D); California State University, San Bernardino (MA); Brigham Young University (BA)
- Occupations: Professor, Historian, Writer
- Employer: Brigham Young University
- Spouses: Harvey B. Black, George Durrant
- Children: 3

Susan Easton Black (born Susan Lindsay Ward in 1944) is a retired professor of Church History and Doctrine at Brigham Young University (BYU) in Provo, Utah. She is also an author of several books related to Joseph Smith and the early history of the Church of Jesus Christ of Latter-day Saints (LDS Church).

== Career ==
Black holds an Ed.D. from BYU, where she joined the faculty in 1978. Black was the first female full-time professor in BYU’s religion department. Black received the Karl G. Maeser Distinguished Faculty Award in 2000 and was the first woman to receive the award. She also served as an associate dean of General Education and Honors. Her passion for LDS history began as a child hearing stories of the early church from her grandmother, born in Utah in 1872, to British immigrant parents.

== LDS Church service ==
In 2009, Black was a founding trustee of the LDS Church-based Nauvoo University. In retirement, she has served LDS Church missions as a psychologist for LDS Family Services, as well as at the Nauvoo Illinois Temple and St. George Temple Visitors’ Center, and a writer for the Priesthood and Family Department. In 2011, Black was invited by the Utah Democrats to be the keynote speaker at their annual Eleanor Roosevelt luncheon.

== Personal life ==
She was married to Harvey B. Black prior to his death. In 2013, she married George Durrant. They later served as missionaries in the Nauvoo Illinois Temple. As of January 2016, they had served several church service historical missions in St. George, Utah.

== Works ==
Among her books are Joseph Smith: Praise to the Man (with John Telford), Joseph, Exploring the Life and Ministry of the Prophet (with Andrew Skinner), Setting the Record Straight: Emma Smith: An Elect Lady, Setting the Record Straight: Joseph Smith, the Mormon Prophet, Son of Man, Vol. 1: The Early Years (with Liz Lemon Swindle), The A to Z of Church History and Doctrine and Covenants, and Who's Who in the Doctrine and Covenants.
