= Martin H. Raish =

Martin H. Raish is Director of the David O. McKay Library at Brigham Young University—Idaho. He has previously worked as an associate librarian at the Harold B. Lee Library at Brigham Young University (BYU), as well as at the Glenn G. Bartle Library at Binghamton University, State University of New York. He has also worked as an adjunct professor at the School of Information Science and Policy at the University of Albany, State University of New York.

Raish is the editor of several periodicals including Musings, Meanderings, and Monsters, Too: Essays on Academic Librarianship (Lanham, MD: The Scarecrow Press, 2003); (with Pat Ensor), Key Guide to Electronic Resources: Art and Art History (Medford, NJ: Information Today, 1996); and (with John L. Sorenson), and Pre-Columbian Contact With the Americas Across the Oceans: An Annotated Bibliography, 2 vols. (Provo: Research Press, 1996).

Raish earned a master's degree in library and information sciences from BYU and a Ph.D. in Pre-Columbian art history (with a specific focus on ancient Mexico) from the University of New Mexico.

== Publications ==
- Raish, Martin H. (June 1996). Pre-Columbian Contact With The Americas Across The Oceans: An Annotated Bibliography. Foundation For Ancient Research &.
- "A Reader's Library". Journal of Book of Mormon Studies. Neal A. Maxwell Institute for Religious Scholarship. 2 August 1999.
- "A Reader's Library". Journal of Book of Mormon Studies. Neal A. Maxwell Institute for Religious Scholarship. 1 September 2000.
