= Roy W. Doxey =

American theologian (1908–1992)

- Born: February 27, 1908; Ogden, Utah United States
- Died: August 10, 1992 (aged 84)
- Occupations: theologian, educator

Roy W. Doxey (27 February 1908 – 10 August 1992) was a theologian and mid-level leader of the Church of Jesus Christ of Latter-day Saints (LDS Church).

Doxey was born in Ogden, Utah. He married Alberta Opheikins in 1934. In 1944 he was an employee of the United States government. In that year he was called to preside over the Eastern States Mission of the LDS Church, based in Philadelphia and covering New York, New Jersey, Pennsylvania, Maryland, West Virginia, and western Connecticut and Massachusetts. While in this position he oversaw the re-establishment of the Hill Cumorah Pageant at the end of World War II, recruiting Harold I. Hansen to head the pageant. Doxey also developed a standardized teaching plan for the use of missionaries. Doxey ended his time as mission president in 1948.

Doxey then joined the faculty of Brigham Young University (BYU) where he taught until about 1974. In June 1963, Doxey was appointed chairman of the Department of Undergraduate Studies in Religion at BYU. He served as acting dean of the College of Religious Education for a short time following dean B. West Belnap's death and before the appointment of Daniel H. Ludlow. In 1969 Doxey became assistant dean of Religion at BYU. Doxey served as Dean of Religious Education at BYU from 1971 to 1974 when he was succeeded by Jeffrey R. Holland. While Dean of Religious Education, Doxey was able to convince members of the BYU administration to not go through with the idea of ending the listing of grades from religion classes.

Doxey also served as president of the Provo Utah Stake. Doxey later served as a Regional Representative of the Twelve and as a member of the Young Men General Board.

In civic affairs, Doxey served for several years on the Utah Valley Hospital board.

Doxey wrote at least twelve books that were published, at least five of which were about the Doctrine and Covenants. He was for eight years a direct employee of the Quorum of the Twelve Apostles.

Doxey's influence is such in Mormon thought that fifteen years after his death he was quoted in a First Presidency Message.
