= LDS edition of the Bible =

Bible of the Church of Jesus Christ of Latter-Day Saints

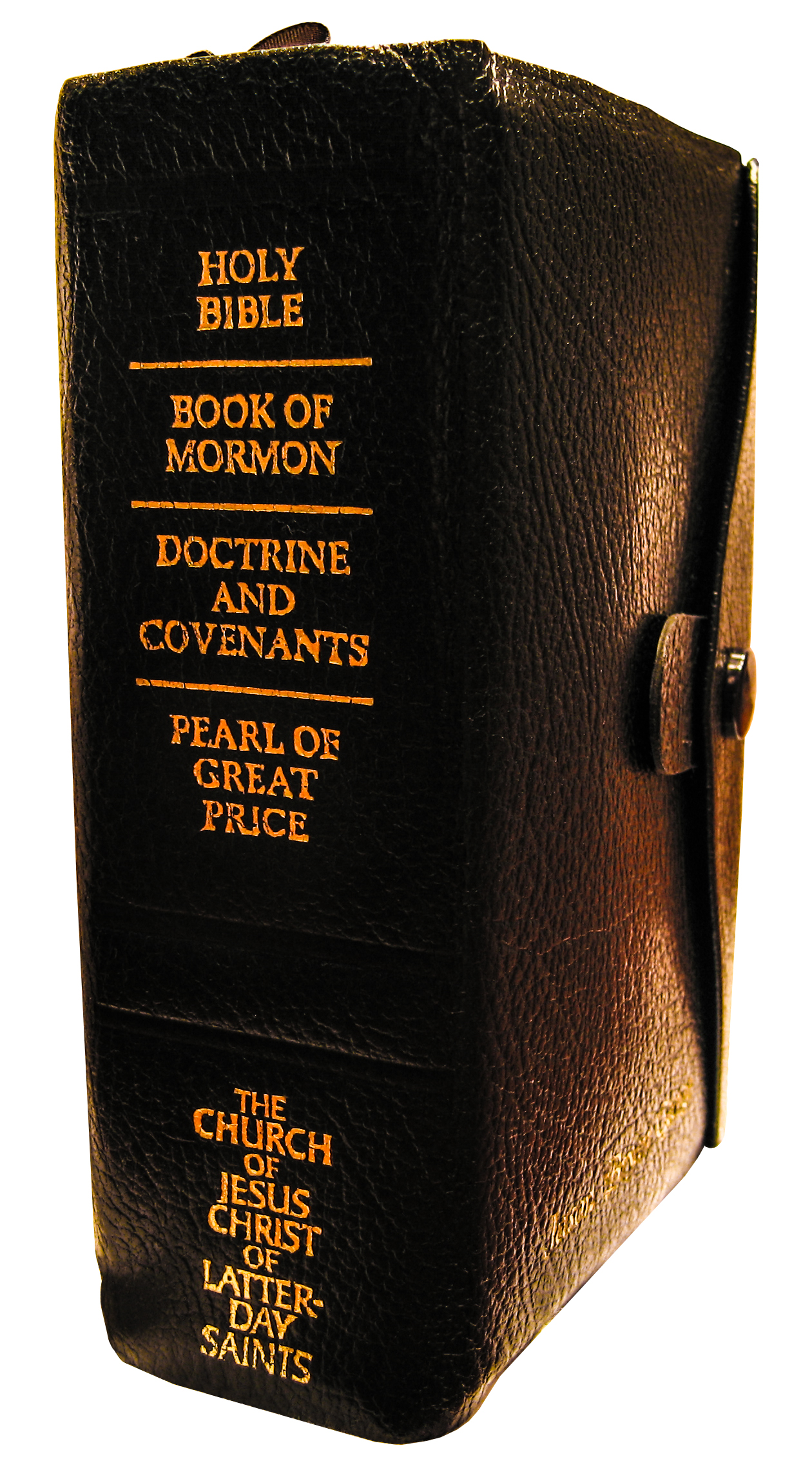
- Full name: Holy Bible King James Version (English); Santa Biblia: Reina-Valera 2009 (Spanish); Bíblia Sagrada, Almeida 2015 (Portuguese)
- Language: English, Spanish, Portuguese and multiple other languages.
- Complete Bible published: 1979 (English); 2009 (Spanish); 2015 (Portuguese)
- Textual basis: King James Version (English); Reina-Valera (Spanish); João Ferreira de Almeida's translation (Portuguese)
- Religious affiliation: The Church of Jesus Christ of Latter-day Saints
- Webpage: www.churchofjesuschrist.org/study/scriptures
- Genesis 1:1–3 In the beginning God created the heaven and the earth. And the earth was without form, and void; and darkness was upon the face of the deep. And the Spirit of God moved upon the face of the waters. And God said, Let there be light: and there was light. John 3:16 For God so loved the world, that he gave his only begotten Son, that whosoever believeth in him should not perish, but have everlasting life.

The LDS edition of the Bible is a version of the Bible published by the Church of Jesus Christ of Latter-day Saints (LDS Church) in English, Spanish, and Portuguese. The text of the LDS Church's English-language Bible is the King James Version, its Spanish-language Bible is a revised Reina-Valera translation, and its Portuguese-language edition is based on the Almeida translation. The editions include footnoting, indexing, and summaries that are consistent with the doctrines of the LDS Church and that integrate the Bible with the church's other canonized Latter-day Saint scriptures. The LDS Church encourages its members to use the LDS Church edition of the Bible.

== English-language King James Version edition ==
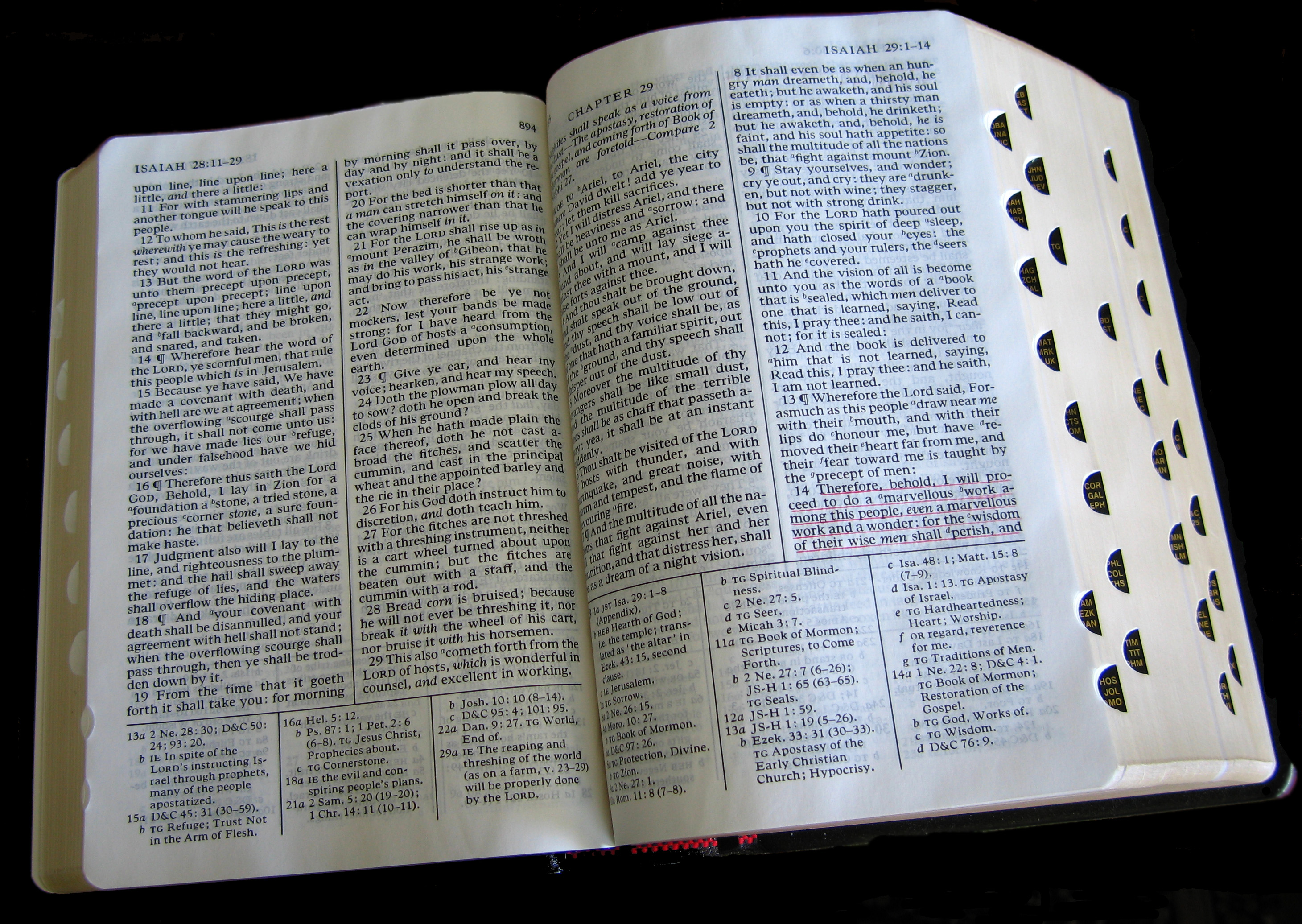
Quadruple combination (LDS Bible and the Standard Works) opened to the Book of Isaiah; note the cross references between Biblical and Latter-day Saint scriptures in the footnotes.

The LDS Church published its first edition of the Bible in English in 1979. The text of the Bible is that of the Authorized King James Version. Both the Old and New Testaments are included, but the Apocrypha is not. Each chapter includes a succinct heading, typically a descriptive summary, though some serve as commentaries. Cross-referencing footnotes to the Bible, the Book of Mormon, the Doctrine and Covenants, and the Pearl of Great Price are included, as is a 600-page topical index and the Bible Dictionary, an adaptation of the Cambridge Bible Dictionary. Selected references to the Joseph Smith Translation of the Bible are included in footnotes, with longer excerpts included in an appendix. Lastly, the edition contains bible maps and a gazetteer. In 1999, the church added color photographs from the Holy Land. The supplements in the edition do not claim doctrinal authority—the institutional church regards only the scriptural text of the King James Version (and its other standard works) as canonical—"though this fact is not particularly prominent in the minds of Church members" who have historically tended to consider the supplements normative.

Thomas S. Monson, a church apostle at the time who later became church president, headed the Scriptures Publications Committee which oversaw the publication of the church's English-language edition of the Bible. The committee included Bruce R. McConkie and Boyd K. Packer, also apostles, and briefly also included apostles Howard W. Hunter and Marvin J. Ashton. For technical assistance, the committee called on outside assistance, including at one point "at least one hundred faculty and students at Brigham Young University" (BYU) as Robert J. Matthews, a former dean of Religious Education at BYU who was among the committee's assistants, reports.

The English-language edition's supplements promulgates "strongly conservative" theological positions largely reflecting McConkie's views. McConkie wrote all the chapter headings, and he was an associate of Matthews, who was the chief compiler of the adapted Bible Dictionary.

In 1992, the church's First Presidency announced the King James Version was the church's official English Bible, stating, "[w]hile other Bible versions may be easier to read than the King James Version, in doctrinal matters latter-day revelation supports the King James Version in preference to other English translations." In 2010, the church added this statement to its Handbook, which directs official church policy and programs.

New editions of the church's English Bible and other standard works were released in 2013. Updates made to the Bible included more modern spellings, corrections of typographical errors, and changes to the supplements.

== Spanish-language Reina-Valera edition ==
In 2009, the LDS Church published a Spanish-language edition of the Bible. Entitled Santa Biblia: Reina-Valera 2009, the text of the Bible is based on the 1909 version of the Reina-Valera translation. Changes to the text included modernization of grammar and vocabulary. Like the English-language edition, the Spanish-language edition includes LDS-oriented footnotes and chapter headings, as well as a topical index. The church's Spanish-language Bible project was supervised by general authorities Jay E. Jensen and Lynn A. Mickelsen.

== Portuguese-language Almeida edition ==
In 2015, the LDS Church released a new Portuguese-language edition of the Bible, a revision of the edited and corrected 1914 edition of João Ferreira de Almeida's translation. This version was initially released electronically, and it became available in print in March 2016.

== Other languages ==
As of 2015, the LDS Church does not publish Bibles in any other languages besides English, Spanish, and Portuguese. However, as stated in the General Handbook, "[i]n many other non-English languages, the Church has approved a non–Latter-day Saint edition of the Bible for use in Church meetings and classes."

In 2021, the church published a digital version of the Bible in German. The translation for this version was completed by Hermann Menge and is in the public domain. At the time of the digital publication, the church expected to update the text with its own footnotes, cross references, and chapter headings in the subsequent years.

== See also ==
- Joseph Smith Translation of the Bible
- LDS Bible videos
- Modern English Bible translations
