= Society for Early Historic Archaeology =

The Society for Early Historic Archaeology was an organization based at Brigham Young University (BYU) in Provo, Utah which sought to disseminate information related to Hebrew-Christian and Latter-day Saint scriptures and archaeology throughout the world of the earliest historical time period.

== History ==
The society was organized in BYU's Department of Archaeology as the University Archaeological Society in 1949. It published a newsletter and held annual symposiums. In 1967 its name was changed to the Society for Early Historic Archaeology. It split off from BYU in 1979 and afterward began a slow decline until ceasing in 1990.

== Sources ==
- header of society newsletter copy at SHIELDS website
- Society's constitution
