= Kent P. Jackson =

American scholar (born 1949)

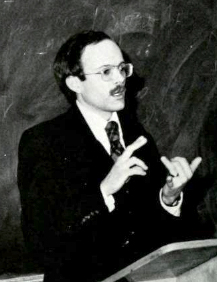
- Jackson in 1982
- Born: Kent Phillips Jackson; August 9, 1949 (age 77); Salt Lake City, Utah, US
- Spouse: Nancy Porter

Academic background
- Education: Brigham Young University; University of Michigan
- Thesis: The Ammonite Language of the Iron Age (1980)
- Academic advisor: David Noel Freedman

Academic work
- Discipline: Biblical studies; Near Eastern studies
- School or tradition: Mormonism
- Institutions: Brigham Young University

Kent Phillips Jackson (born 1949) is an American scholar who was a professor of ancient scripture at Brigham Young University (BYU). He has written on Joseph Smith's translation of and commentary on the Bible.

== Early life and education ==
Jackson was born in Salt Lake City, Utah, on August 9, 1949. He received his bachelor's degree in ancient studies from Brigham Young University (BYU). Jackson holds a master's degree and a PhD in Near Eastern studies from the University of Michigan.

== Career ==
Jackson was a professor of religion at BYU from 1980 to June 2017 and taught courses on ancient scripture. The courses he taught include the Old Testament, New Testament, and The Pearl of Great Price. He was interested in the common ground between the Bible and the beliefs and practices of The Church of Jesus Christ of Latter-day Saints. He also focused on the Middle East.

Jackson was the associate dean of religious education at BYU. He was also the associate director of the BYU Jerusalem Center for Near Eastern Studies. He was the chair of Near Eastern studies at BYU's David M. Kennedy Center for International Studies. Jackson was the regional president of the Society of Biblical Literature as well as the American Academy of Religion.

He is the author and editor of many publications. He has edited works including A Witness for the Restoration and Joseph Smith, the Prophet and Seer. Jackson was also the editor of the 1996 publications of Solomon Spaulding's Manuscript Found.

== Selected publications ==
=== Books ===
- From Apostasy to Restoration (1996)
- The Restored Gospel and the Book of Genesis (2001)
- The Book of Moses and the Joseph Smith Translation Manuscripts (2005)
- Joseph Smith's Commentary on the Bible (2006)

=== Chapters ===
- "'Watch and Remember': The New Testament and the Great Apostasy" in By Study and Also by Faith (1990)
- "Zenock" from To All the World (2000)
- "Scenes from Early Latter-day Saint History" in the Disciple as a Witness (2000)
- "The Beginnings of Christianity in the Book of Mormon" in The Book of Mormon: The Keystone Scripture (1988)
- "Are Christians Christians" in No Weapon Shall Prosper: New Light on Sensitive Issues (2011)

=== Articles ===
- "What Every Latter-day Saint Should Know about Islam" in Religious Educator 4, no. 2 (2003):9–23
- "Reprove, Betimes, and Sharpness in the Vocabulary of Joseph Smith" from Religious Educator 6, no. 2 (2005):97–104
- "Chapters, Verses, Punctuation, Spelling, and Italics in the King James Version" from Religious Educator 7, no. 2 (2006):41–64
- "Lessons from the Scriptures: A Conversation with Keith H. Meservy" from Religious Educator 10, no. 2 (2009):67–76
- "Early Signs of the Apostasy", Ensign, December 1984, p. 8
