= Bruce A. Chadwick =

Bruce A. Chadwick is an emeritus professor of sociology at Brigham Young University (BYU).

Chadwick has a Ph.D. from Washington University in St. Louis.

Chadwick was for a time director of BYU's Center for Studies of the Family. From 1992 to 1996 he did an exhaustive study along with Brent L. Top involving 4000 participants of religious affiliation and other actions of Latter-day Saint teens.

Chadwick edited the Statistical Handbook on the American Family with Tim B. Heaton and the Statistical Handbook of Racial Groups in the United States with Heaton and Cardell K. Jacobsen both published by Oryx Press. He also co-authored many works on Muncie, Indiana as part of the Middletown Studies with Howard M. Bahr and Theodore Caplow such as All Faithful People: Continuity and Change in the Middletown Region and Recent Social Trends in the United States: 1960-1990. In the 1970s Chadwick coauthored multiple articles on the Native American experience in the city of Seattle.

Chadwick's "Hanging Out, Hooking Up and Celestial Marriage", a devotional address given at Brigham Young University, was one of the sources cited in Dallin H. Oaks's similarly themed CES fireside address, "Dating versus Hanging Out".

== Selected speeches ==
- "Hanging Out, Hooking Up and Celestial Marriage" – Devotional address given at Brigham Young University on March 2, 1999
