= Joseph Smith Academy =

The Joseph Smith Academy ("JSA") was an educational complex run by the Church of Jesus Christ of Latter-day Saints in Nauvoo, Illinois, less than 1,000 feet (300 m) from the Nauvoo Temple. Until recently, the Academy was home to a BYU distance study program focusing on church history. For this reason, the Academy is sometimes referred to as the BYU Nauvoo Center.

The Academy no longer is functioning and the building was torn down beginning in September 2007. Any new structures built on the land would be located to meet then-LDS church president Gordon B. Hinckley desire to not have any buildings obstruct the view to and from the Nauvoo Temple.

The dormitories at JSA provided housing for local missionaries, visiting youth groups and conferences, CES students on distance learning expedition, and other interests.

The building in which the JSA is housed was purchased from Catholic nuns who had used the facilities to run a girl's boarding school. The building had a unique architecture and interior design, with curving hallways, 5-foot-tall (1.5 m) lampshades, "bubblepaper" wallpaper and many other curious and beautiful traits.

The first group of BYU students to live in the JSA came in January 2000, although BYU had sent students to live in the Nauvoo area previously. Portions of Peace, Love & Gingerbread, a book about the first semester students lived in the JSA, circulated around the internet for a while but interest was fleeting.

== See also ==
- University of Nauvoo
- Nauvoo University
