= Spencer J. Condie =

American Mormon leader (born 1940)

Second Quorum of the Seventy
- April 1, 1989 – June 6, 1992
- End reason: Transferred to the First Quorum of the Seventy

First Quorum of the Seventy
- June 6, 1992 – October 2, 2010
- End reason: Granted general authority emeritus status

Emeritus General Authority
- October 2, 2010

Personal details
- Born: Spencer Joel Condie; August 27, 1940 (age 85); Preston, Idaho, United States
- Alma mater: Brigham Young University (B.A.); University of Utah (M.A.); University of Pittsburgh (Ph.D.)

Spencer Joel Condie (born August 27, 1940) has been a general authority of the Church of Jesus Christ of Latter-day Saints (LDS Church) since 1989. Condie previously worked as a professor at Brigham Young University (BYU) and also served as a mission president for the LDS Church in Eastern Europe. In 2010, he was designated as an emeritus general authority.

== Early life and education ==
Condie was born in Preston, Idaho. His family lived there until he was fifteen when they moved to Pocatello, Idaho. From 1960 to 1963, Condie served an LDS mission in the church's South German Mission. While there, he met Dorothea Speth, a native of Germany who was also serving as a missionary. They became reacquainted after their missions, a situation encouraged by Blythe Gardner, Condie's mission president. Condie and Speth were married in June 1964.

Condie received a B.A. from BYU, an M.A. from the University of Utah, and a Ph.D. from the University of Pittsburgh. He worked as a professor of both sociology and ancient scripture at BYU from 1969 to 1984 and again from 1987 to 1989.

== LDS Church service ==
In the LDS Church, Condie served as a bishop, stake president and regional representative. In 1984, he became the president of the church's Austria Vienna Mission. In this capacity he not only oversaw missionary work in Austria, but also its development in Poland, Czechoslovakia, Hungary, Yugoslavia and Greece.

In April 1989, Condie became a member of the Second Quorum of the Seventy. Later that year, Condie was called to serve in the presidency of the church's Europe Area, where he again worked in opening missionary efforts in Eastern Europe. In 1991, Condie became the president of the Europe Mediterranean Area that was formed from dividing the former Europe Area. In 1992, Condie was called as a member of the First Quorum of the Seventy.

From October 2001 until October 2003, Condie served as a counselor in the church's Young Men general presidency. In 2003, Condie was the keynote speaker at BYU's annual Genealogy and Family History Conference. From 2003 to 2008, he served in the presidency of the New Zealand/Pacific Islands Area, based in Auckland, New Zealand. On October 2, 2010, Condie was released from the First Quorum of the Seventy and designated an emeritus general authority at the church's general conference.

From 2010 to 2013, Condie served as president of the Nauvoo Illinois Temple.

In 2003, Condie published a biography of Russell M. Nelson. In 2014, Condie spoke at the 18th Annual Education Conference at Southern Virginia University.

== Publications ==
David J. Cherrington; Spencer J. Condie; J. Lynn England (September 1979). "Age and Work Values". The Academy of Management Journal. 22 (3): 617–623. JSTOR 255750.

- Life in Large Families/Views of Mormon Women Main author: Howard M. Bahr with S. J. Condie and Kristen L. Goodman being the main contributors. ISBN 0-8191-2551-2
- In Perfect Balance (Bookcraft, 1993)
- Russell M. Nelson: Father, Surgeon, Apostle (2003)
