= Paedagogus =

2nd century work by Clement of Alexandria

Paedagogus (Greek: Παιδαγωγός, "Pedagogue") is the second in the great trilogy of Clement of Alexandria.

Having laid a foundation in the knowledge of divine truth in the first book, he goes on in the Paedagogus to develop a Christian ethic. His design does not prevent him from taking a large part of his material from the Stoic Musonius Rufus, the master of Epictetus; but for Clement the real instructor is the incarnate Logos.

The first book deals with the religious basis of Christian morality, the second and third with the individual cases of conduct. As with Epictetus, true virtue shows itself with him in its external evidences by a natural, simple, and moderate way of living.

== See also ==
- Ante-Nicene Fathers
- Protrepsis and paraenesis
- Paedagogus

== Links to Paedagogus texts ==
- Paedagogus (in Greek) at The Son of Man website. Archived on 2016-03-03.
- The Paedagogus (The Instructor) (in English) at New Advent website
- The Instructor [Pædagogus] (in English) is on pages 450-637 of Ante-Nicene Fathers, Volume 2 Philip Schaff, ed., at Christian Classics Ethereal Library. Instructions: Click the large downward-pointing arrow ("Download"), then click "PDF".
- Le Pédagogue (parallel Greek and French) at L'antiquité grecque et latine du moyen âge [The ancient Greek and Latin of the Middle Ages] website
- Paidagogos (in German) at University of Fribourg website
