= Sidney B. Sperry =

American LDS scholar (1895–1977)

Sidney Branton Sperry (December 26, 1895 – September 4, 1977) was one of three scholars who were members of the Church of Jesus Christ of Latter-day Saints (LDS Church) who began the scholarly and systematic study of the Book of Mormon in the mid-20th century — the other two being John L. Sorenson and Hugh W. Nibley. Sperry was also a leading Latter-day Saint scholar of the Bible.

Sperry was born in Salt Lake City, Utah Territory. In 1917, Sperry graduated from the University of Utah with a B.S. in Chemistry. For the next two years he worked for the United States Bureau of Metallurgical Research. Sperry then served as an LDS Church missionary in the Southern States Mission from 1919 to 1921. He was for much of this time president of the church's South Carolina District.

After returning from his mission, Sperry began work as a seminary and institute instructor for the Church Educational System (CES). He received an MA from the University of Chicago Divinity School in 1926 and a Ph.D. from that university's Oriental Language and Literatures Department in 1931. He then did a year of post-doctoral research in archaeology at the American School of Oriental Research.

== Career ==
In 1932, Sperry joined the faculty of Brigham Young University (BYU). In May 1962, he was given the Karl G. Maeser Distinguished Teaching Award. He retired in 1971.

Among his books were Our Book of Mormon (1947), The Book of Mormon Testified (1952) and Book of Mormon Compendium (1968). In 1960, Sperry's Doctrine and Covenants Compendium was published. He also wrote "Problems of the Book of Mormon" in 1964, which was later published again as "Answers to Book of Mormon Questions" in 1967 with some additions.

He is credited in circles of the LDS Church for giving the passages in 2 Nephi chapter 4 the popular name "The Psalm of Nephi" in his book Our Book of Mormon.

In the early 1970s, Sperry's family established a research fund in his honor to promote original research of general interest, and a conference now called the Sidney B. Sperry Symposium has been held annually at BYU since 1973. In 1975, it featured not only a member of the Religious Instruction faculty but also a professor from another department on campus, as well as a CES scholar, beyond BYU. This was the beginning of a greater "outreach to the entire religious education community.". A book with the proceedings is published annually by the Religious Studies Center in cooperation with Deseret Book.

== Personal life ==
In September 1921, Sperry married Eva Lila Braithwaite. They eventually had eight children.
