= Brent L. Top =

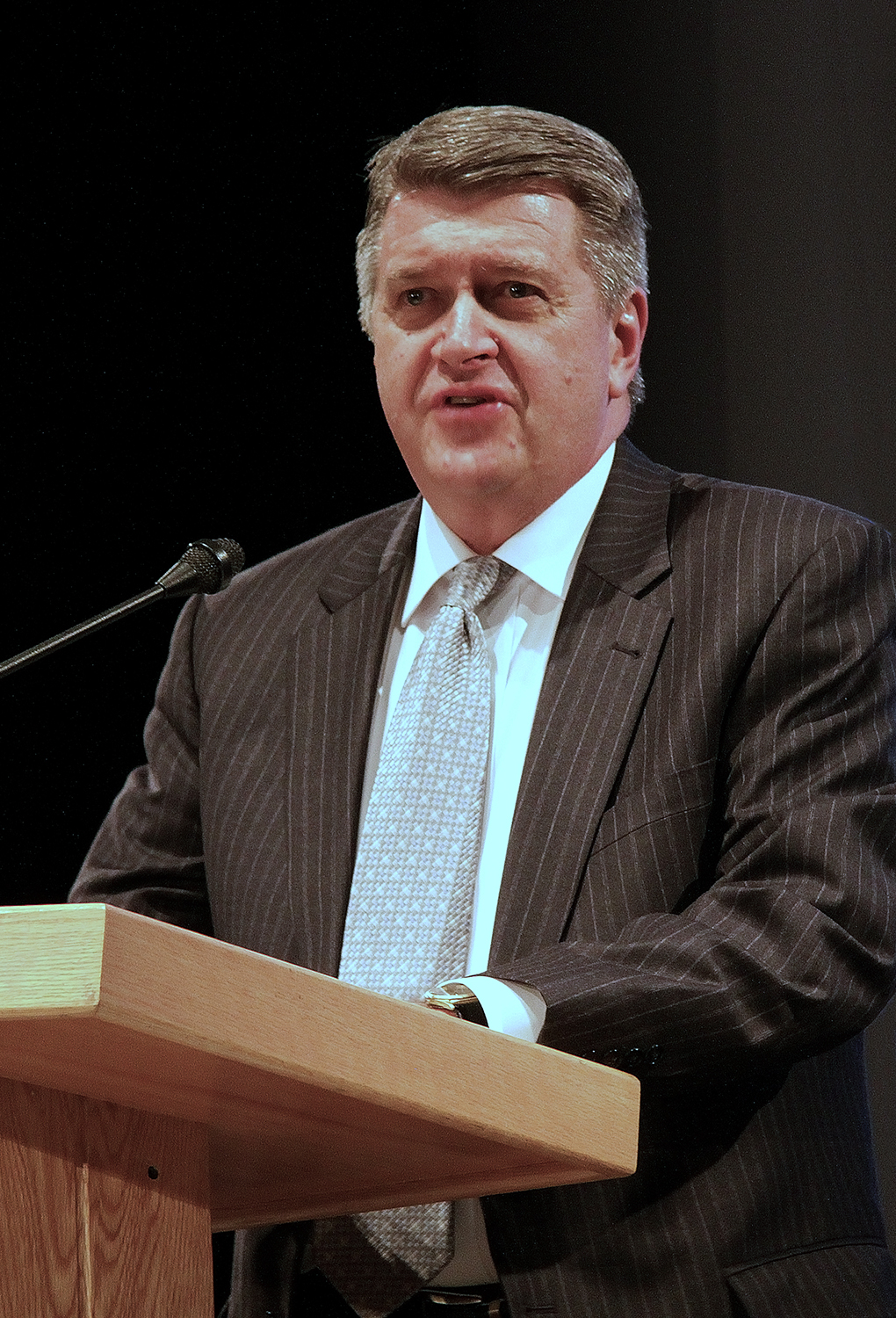
Brent LaMar Top

Brent LaMar Top (born 1953) is a professor of Church History and Doctrine at Brigham Young University (BYU). Top served as dean of religious education at BYU and the director of BYU's Religious Studies Center from 2013 to 2018.

== Biographical background ==
Top is a native of Idaho Falls. He served a mission for the Church of Jesus Christ of Latter-day Saints (LDS Church) in Denmark. He holds a bachelor's degree in history, a master's degree in instructional media and a Ph.D. in instructional science and technology, all from BYU.

Prior to joining the BYU faculty in 1987, Top was both a seminary and an institute instructor in the Church Educational System. He currently holds an endowed professorship in moral education at BYU.

Among other callings in the LDS Church, Top has served as a bishop, member of a stake presidency, and as president of the Pleasant Grove Utah East Stake. Top was president of the church's Illinois Peoria Mission from 2004 to 2007, and the president of the church’s Mormon Battalion Historic Sites in San Diego, California, from 2022 to 2024.

== Publications ==
Top has written several books, including Ten Secrets Wise Parents Know: Tried and True Things You Can Do To Raise Faithful, Confident Responsible Children (written with Bruce A. Chadwick), When You Can't Do It Alone and Why Bad Things Happen to Good People. He has also written articles for such publications as The Elementary School Journal.

== Sources ==
- Brent L. Top at the MLCA Database
- BYU bio
- "New mission presidents", Church News, January 24, 2004
