= Robert J. Matthews =

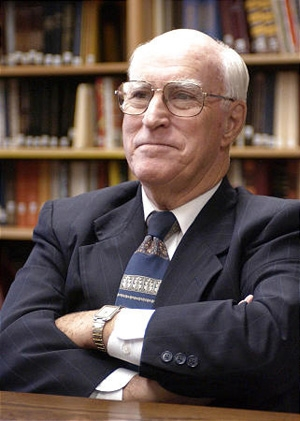
Robert J. Matthews

Robert James Matthews (12 September 1926 – 30 August 2009) was a Latter-day Saint religious educator and scholar, teaching in the departments of Ancient Scripture and Religious Education at Brigham Young University (BYU) in Provo, Utah.

Beginning with personal contacts early in his career, Matthews was instrumental in conciliating relations between religious scholars affiliated with the Church of Jesus Christ of Latter-day Saints (LDS Church) and the Reorganized Church of Jesus Christ of Latter Day Saints (now called the Community of Christ), which had separated in a schism in the 1840s. The two religious communities and their scholars had long been at odds over access to and interpretation of important early texts of the Latter Day Saint movement. Matthews was particularly influential when in 1969 and 1970, scholars affiliated with the RLDS were invited to meetings of the Mormon History Association. The new scholars were welcomed, and some were chosen as officers in the organization in later years. Matthews is also noted for his promotion of the concept that the currently-available text of the Joseph Smith Translation of the Bible is reliable and authentic.

== Biography ==
Matthews was born in Evanston, Wyoming., the youngest child of immigrant parents, who independently joined the LDS Church in England and moved to the United States. He earned a bachelor's degree in Political Science, a master's degree in Geography, and a PhD in Ancient Scriptures, all from BYU. His doctoral dissertation was A Plainer Translation: Joseph Smith's Translation of the Bible – A History and Commentary.

Matthews and his wife, Shirley Neves, were the parents of four children: Camille, Daniel, Robert, and Tricia.

Matthews died in Provo, Utah, after an extended hospitalization for complications following open heart surgery.

== Teaching and scholarship ==
Matthews began teaching in the Church Educational System (CES), as a seminary teacher in Soda Springs, Idaho, in 1955. He also taught institute classes in Southern California at the University of California, Los Angeles, under the direction of Paul H. Dunn, and was a course writer and editor with the seminaries and institutes division of CES.

In 1968, Matthews received a PhD in Ancient Scriptures from BYU. He began teaching in the Division of Religious Education at BYU in 1971. He served as dean of Religion Education at BYU for eight and a half years and then was a professor and department chair of the Ancient Scripture Department until his retirement, in 1992.

Matthews has the distinction of being the first person from the LDS Church to be allowed by the Community of Christ to work with the original manuscript of the Joseph Smith Translation of the Bible, which was in its possession. He was a principal collaborator involved in compiling the Encyclopedia of Mormonism and authored articles on the Book of Moses and the Joseph Smith Translation of the Bible.

== LDS Church service ==
From 1946 to 1948, Matthews was a Mormon missionary in California. His mission president was Oscar W. McConkie, father of Bruce R. McConkie.

In the 1970s, Matthews served on the Church Adult Correlation Committee. Earlier, he had served as a bishop, high councilor and stake president. In the mid-1990s, Matthews was the first president of the Mount Timpanogos Utah Temple. At the time of his death, he was serving as a stake patriarch.

Matthews was the chief editor of the LDS Church's 1979 Bible Dictionary, which is printed together with the church's English edition of the King James Bible.

== Publications ==
- "A Plainer Translation": Joseph Smith's Translation of the Bible, a History and commentary (Brigham Young University Press: Provo, Utah, 1975). ISBN 0-8425-1411-2, OCLC 1230845
- A Burning Light: The Life and Ministry of John the Baptist (Brigham Young University Press: Provo, Utah, 1972). ISBN 0-8425-1470-8, OCLC 481178
- Selected Writings of Robert J. Matthews (Deseret Book: Salt Lake City, 1999). ISBN 1-57345-552-0, OCLC 42290385
- "Historicity and the Children of God" in Paul Y. Hoskisson, ed., Historicity and the Latter-day Saints Scriptures (Religious Studies Center, Brigham Young University: Provo, Utah, 2001). ISBN 1-57734-928-8, OCLC 48749213
- Joseph Smith’s Revision of the Bible: Notes, History, and Comparisons. Provo: Brigham Young University Press, 1969.
- Who's Who in the Book of Mormon. Salt Lake City: Deseret Book, 1976.
- "A Bible! A Bible!" Salt Lake City: Bookcraft, 1990.
- Behold the Messiah: New Testament Insights from Latter-day Revelation. Salt Lake City: Bookcraft, 1994.
- 'Unto All Nations: A Guide to the Book of Acts and the Writings of Paul. Salt Lake City: Deseret Book, 1975.
- 'There's No Substitute for Being There: Educational and Spiritual Benefits of Travel. Provo: BYU Religious Education and BYU Alumni Association, 1982.
- 'The Hope for Immortality: A Desire for the Ages. Provo: Division of Continuing Education, Brigham Young University, 1990. Reprinted in Selected Writings of Robert J. Matthews, 488–504.
- 'Toward a Greater Portrayal of the Master. Provo: Division of Continuing Education, Brigham Young University, 1995.
- 'The Role of the Joseph Smith Translation of the Bible in the Restoration of Doctrine. Provo: Foundation for Ancient Research and Ancient Mormon Studies, 1997.
- 'How the LDS Edition of the King James Bible Came to Be. Provo: Crandall Historical Printing Museum, 2005.
