= Douglas D. Alder =

American historian (1932–2023)

- Born: November 10, 1932; Salt Lake City, Utah, U.S.
- Died: November 25, 2023 (aged 91)
- Education: University of Utah
- Occupations: Teacher, lecturer, education administrator
- Known for: Education administration

Douglas D. Alder (November 10, 1932 – November 25, 2023) was an American historian and academic administrator who was president of Dixie College (now Utah Tech University) from 1986 to 1993.

== Biography ==
Douglas D. Alder was born and raised in Salt Lake City, Utah. He attended East High School, Class of '51, and studied at the University of Utah, receiving both his bachelor's (history, German) and master's degrees (history, political science) at "the U." He then earned a Ph.D. (modern European history) at the University of Oregon in 1966. As part of his Ph.D., he was awarded a Fulbright Program scholarship to study and conduct research at the University of Vienna (Austria). He joined the faculty at Utah State University in 1963 and taught a wide array of classes, including modern European history, until the summer of 1986 when he moved from Logan to St. George, Utah to take on the presidency of Dixie College. He had only been at Utah State four years when the university awarded him 'teacher of the year' honors during its Robins Awards ceremony (1967); he is one of the youngest professors to receive the award. He received Danforth fellowships and became critically interested in how teachers teach history. He achieved one more Fulbright Program scholarship (Bonn, Germany), and also an American Council on Education Fellowship (one-year sabbatical) to study how to be a college president; he worked with Chancellor Byrum E. Carter and President John W. Ryan of Indiana University-Bloomington in 1973–74. Thereafter he became the director of USU's celebrated honors program, helping students elevate their academic goals and achievement, particularly in aiming for professional and academic careers, and obtaining graduate education beyond Utah State. He was known on campus as an engaged, in-demand mentor to students. Utah State gives a scholarship in his name each year.

Alder enjoyed friendships and collegial relationships with many Logan faculty members and university leaders in the 1960s, 70s and 80s, including Leonard J. Arrington, Milton R. Merrill, Daryl Chase, S. George Ellsworth, Stanford Cazier, Dan E. Jones, Glen L. Taggart, Joseph G. Morse, Karen Morse (chemist), Warren L. Burton, Kent K. Robson, J. Duncan Brite, F. Ross Peterson, Norman L. Jones, Robert A. Hoover, R. Edward Glatfelter, Derrick Thom, Lawrence (Larry) O. Cannon, Val R. Christensen, Max F. Dalby, Michael Ballam, Evan N. Stevenson, Marilyn B. Noyes, Brent C. Miller, Twain C. Tippetts, Jon I. Anderson, Harrison T. Groutage, Nick Eastman, Don Smellie, Duane E. Hedin, Byron R. Burnham, Keith T. Checketts, Antone Bringhurst, Gary H. Richardson, Thomas D. Bunch, J. Derle Thorpe, David H. Luthy, Basudeb Biswas, H. Craig Petersen, and others. He was a close colleague of USU alumna and Mormon historian Jan Shipps and her husband Anthony Shipps of Indiana University (Indianapolis and Bloomington, respectively). Additional colleagues, associates and friends of Alder in this category (Mormon thought, history and scholarship) include Juanita Brooks, Karl Brooks, Thomas D. Alexander, Eugene England, Bruce C. Hafen, James B. Allen, Richard Bushman, Charles S. Peterson, Levi S. Peterson, Maureen Whipple, and others.

As a new college president in 1986, Alder faced significant institutional financial hurdles; Dixie College's budget was small, but faced a 6% cut mandated by Governor Norman H. Bangerter and the Utah State Legislature. Dr. Alder entered the scene with the task of cutting parts of the college's already bare-bones budget. As difficult as that first year was, and as hard as those cuts were to functions on campus, Dr. Alder was able to raise the ambitions for his colleagues, and set out on a course of expanding, improving and growing the college. He initiated a capital campaign (the college's first), and created a national advisory board of volunteer leaders. The campaign was successful (beyond its target), and Dr. Alder created a culture of collaboration, community, development and advancement at Dixie College, including hiring outside consultants and new internal staff, as well as recruiting volunteers and leaders to lead initiatives. During his administration, a campus master plan was developed and the number of buildings at Dixie College expanded. A classroom teacher by profession, Alder became adept at fundraising. Significant private donations changed the landscape of the college. The Val A. Browning Learning Resources Center was built, and additions to the science building and library were completed during Alder's presidency. Construction of the Udvar-Hazy Business Building and Gardner Student Center also began. It was also under Alder's direction that the "College Inn" (now known as "University Inn," in downtown St. George, one mile from campus) became part of Dixie College's Elderhostel Program; Alder extensively developed Elderhostel (now known as Road Scholar) at Dixie College, and emphasized life-long learning; he spent time and energy promoting Dixie College to visitors, guests and especially new retirees from across the nation who came to Dixie College to take part in Elderhostel. A successful honors program director at his previous institution, Alder created Dixie College's first honors program. With his marketing director, Mark Petersen, Alder also created a new tag line for the college: "Dixie College: An Academic Climate." Alder was enthusiastic about the history, natural landscape, enviable surroundings and warm weather of Washington County, Utah. With Robert and Peggy Sears, Alder extended a foothold in the region's artistic world with the Robert N. and Peggy Sears Invitational Art Show which brings thousands of art lovers to campus each February and March to see the works of local and regional artists. After his presidency, Alder returned to classroom teaching at the college, as well as at Road Scholar, and the Institute for Continued Learning (ICL).

Alder served as president of the Mormon History Association (1977–1978). He was involved in the early development of ''Dialogue: A Journal of Mormon Thought'' and Sunstone (magazine). He was part of the New Mormon History movement. He was an active, life-long member of The Church of Jesus Christ of Latter-day Saints, and served in numerous volunteer roles throughout his life, including as a full-time missionary to Austria, bishop of a college student ward (Logan), bishop of a working single adult ward (Logan), high councilor (five different councils, including in Indiana and Vienna, Austria), branch presidency (St. George), and as a counselor in the presidency of the St. George Utah Temple. He taught gospel classes at nearly every stage of his life. For twenty years, Alder served as a leader in the St. George Temple. He married Elaine M. Reiser in the Salt Lake Temple in 1958. The couple had four children. While Dixie's "First Lady," Elaine Alder is credited with leading the effort to create St. George's Pioneer Center for the Arts, saving the Opera House, and initiating and founding the St. George Art Museum. Both Alders were deeply involved in each other's projects and community leadership efforts.

Alder, Blaine M. Yorgason and Richard A. Schmutz wrote the book All That Was Promised: The St. George Temple and the Unfolding of the Restoration (Salt Lake City: Deseret Book, 2013). He also wrote A History of Washington County: From Isolation to Destination in 1996 with Karl Brooks. In 2010 his A Century of Dixie State College of Utah was published; he gave the Juanita Brooks Lecture on this topic.

Alder also wrote the novel The Sons of Bear Lake, published in 2002. Dr. Alder was an active writer for many decades, publishing his own materials, and also editing and compiling other works, including Cache Valley: Essays of Her Past and People.

Alder was involved in numerous volunteer groups and activities, including the United States Bicentennial (Logan, Utah), the Logan Library (board chair), especially the creation of the new library in the old Sears building on Logan's Main Street (1980s), and the Washington County Library System (board chair, building several libraries). He was a leader of the Washington County Historical Society and particularly involved in preserving and restoring historical buildings and properties, including the downtown St. George area, and the Grafton Heritage Partnership Project in Grafton, Utah. After visiting Connor Prairie in Indiana, he set out to create a similar opportunity in Utah, resulting in 'Historic St. George LIVE!' which entertained and educated people visiting St. George's historic sites (1996 to 2024). He started "Colleagues of the Dixie Faculty" (now known as Legacy or Legacy Lecture Series) to encourage retired professionals to pursue life-long learning, and intellectual and academic engagement. The group met at the Val A. Browning Building's auditorium on campus, and now meets at the St. George Tabernacle. He lived in St. George, Utah from 1986 to 2022.

Alder died November 25, 2023, in Lehi, Utah, at the age of 91.
