= Bookcraft =

American Mormon book publisher

- Founded: 1943
- Founder: John Kenneth Orton
- Successor: Deseret Book
- Country of origin: United States
- Headquarters location: Salt Lake City
- Publication types: Books

Bookcraft was a major publisher of books and products for members of the Church of Jesus Christ of Latter-day Saints (LDS Church).

== History ==
In 1940, LDS Church president Heber J. Grant asked the church's Improvement Era magazine to compile his sermons into a book called Gospel Standards. Compiler G. Homer Durham published it in 1941 as "An Improvement Era Publication", rather than through Deseret Book, the church's official book publisher. During production, Grant suggested that the magazine's staff should start a new LDS publishing company, separate from Deseret Book. In 1942, the Era's business manager, John Kenneth Orton, started Bookcraft as a private publishing house in Salt Lake City, Utah.

When Durham presented a later manuscript to the Era, church leadership restricted book publishing to Deseret Book. John A. Widtsoe and Richard L. Evans, staff members of the Era and early supporters of Bookcraft, referred Durham to Orton's new publishing house. The Gospel Kingdom, Durham's compilation of John Taylor's teachings, was Bookcraft's first major venture in 1943.

Bookcraft remained an Orton family business. When John K. Orton retired to Arizona in 1946, Marvin Wallin became the company's general manager. When Orton died in 1959, ownership passed to his wife. When she died in 1980, the Ortons' son Russell took over with his sister-in-law, Diane Orton.

=== Growth ===
With growth, Bookcraft relocated to new facilities in 1947. In 1969, it moved again to a West Valley City location between Mountain States Bindery and Publisher's Press, the businesses that actually printed and produced Bookcraft's publications. Bookcraft expanded again into new facilities in 1977.

Though independent, Bookcraft established itself as a quasi-official publisher of conservative, faith-promoting works, and was very careful to follow church leadership. Bookcraft eventually became large enough to compete with Deseret Book's lower publishing costs, and become the second largest LDS publisher.

Over the years, Bookcraft innovated and tried new approaches to LDS publishing. In the 1960s, the company experimented with developing LDS young adult fiction. In 1968, Bookcraft hired George Bickerstaff as its first full-time publishing editor. In the early 1970s, it began the Parliament Press imprint for authors to self-publish their books. In 1992, Bookcraft began work with The Beehive Shuppan to translate some titles into Japanese. In 1995, Bookcraft produced The Book of Mormon Studybase, a digital library CD-ROM of books about The Book of Mormon, and contributed to Infobases' LDS Collectors Library CD-ROM.

Because Deseret Book was the largest LDS publisher and bookseller, independents like Bookcraft also distributed to national retailers like B. Dalton, Media Play, and Barnes & Noble. For a time, Bookcraft even planned to create its own chain of retail bookstores.

=== Infobases acquisition ===
In 1997, Russell Orton sold Bookcraft to Infobases, makers of the popular LDS Collectors Library digital library since the early 1990s. Infobases president and CEO, Brad Pelo, assumed these same roles in the new Bookcraft, Inc., and WordPerfect founder Alan C. Ashton became chairman.

With Bookcraft's licenses, the company released the Infobases PocketLibrary for PalmPilot in 1997, an electronic 25-book collection. To counter Deseret Book's GospeLink CD-ROM and website, Bookcraft released an expanded Infobases Collectors Library in 1998 on CD-ROM and on the new LDSWorld.com. Bookcraft then created online stores for its network of resellers, to counter Deseret Book's web sales.

By 1999, Bookcraft was adding about 100 products annually to its catalog, including general authority titles, an important market shared only with Deseret Book. Bookcraft also had strong sales with titles by BYU professors, titles on church history and doctrine, and the bestselling The Work and the Glory series by Gerald N. Lund, which sold millions of copies.

=== Deseret Book merger ===
In early 1999, Bookcraft was acquired by Deseret Management Corporation (DMC), the parent company of the LDS Church's for-profit businesses. This allowed the church to expand in the larger "values-oriented" publishing market, and reduce translation costs of titles for international sale. The merger also brought more writings by general authorities under the church's ownership, allowing for electronic and print collaborations with other DMC entities (such as Deseret Book, the Deseret News, and Bonneville International) and church entities (such as Brigham Young University and other entities within the Church Educational System).

The Bookcraft brand name continued as an imprint for inspirational, self-help, youth and fiction titles, while doctrinal, historical and biographical works would be under the Deseret Book brand. Shadow Mountain was also created as a new imprint for "values-oriented" books in the national market, and Eagle Gate Press was created for specialty items such as library editions, art books and non-book products such as bookmarks and jewelry.

DMC then formed World Media Inc. to oversee Bookcraft's electronic projects, and decide fate of Infobase products and GospeLink. A new Infobases Library was released in 1999, before merging into GospeLink, to become GospeLink 2001. The expanded collection was also at LDSWorld.com, along with new General Conference audio streaming, and was hosted by Millennial Star (MStar.net), the church's new ISP.

The merger created a publisher with a dominant position in the LDS market. Over next few years, Deseret Book would also acquire Excel Entertainment Group (an LDS-oriented film and music company), Seagull Book & Tape (the next largest LDS-oriented bookstore chain), and Covenant Communications (the next largest LDS-oriented publisher).

The Bookcraft imprint was eventually discontinued by Deseret Book Publishing and currently its only imprints in use are Deseret Book, Shadow Mountain, and Ensign Peak.

== Notable work ==
=== Books ===
Before becoming an imprint of Deseret Book, Bookcraft made many notable contributions to LDS literature, including:

- John A. Widtsoe, Evidences and Reconciliations (1943, 3 volumes)
- Hugh Nibley, No, Ma'am, That's Not History (1946)
- Hugh Nibley, Lehi in the Desert and the World of the Jaredites (1952)
- W. Cleon Skousen, the Thousand Years Series (1953–1966, 3 volumes)
- Joseph Fielding Smith, Doctrines of Salvation (1954–1956, 3 volumes)
- Bruce R. McConkie, Mormon Doctrine (1958)
- Duane Crowther, Prophecy: Key to the Future (1962)
- Bruce R. McConkie, Doctrinal New Testament Commentary (1965–1973, 3 volumes)
- James R. Clark, Messages of the First Presidency (1965–1975, 6 volumes)
- Duane Crowther, Life Everlasting (1967)
- Spencer W. Kimball, The Miracle of Forgiveness (1969)
- Edward L. Kimball, Spencer W. Kimball (1977)
- Boyd K. Packer, The Holy Temple (1980)
- Stephen Covey, The Divine Center (1982)
- Eugene England, Why the Church is as True as the Gospel (1986)
- Bruce C. Hafen, The Believing Heart (1986)
- Leonard J. Arrington, Mothers of the Prophets (1987)
- Truman G. Madsen, Joseph Smith, the Prophet (1989)
- Gerald N. Lund, The Work and the Glory series (1990–98)
- The Neal A. Maxwell Quote Book (1997)

The Teachings of the Latter-day Prophets series, compilations of teachings of LDS Church presidents, which included The Gospel Kingdom: Selections from the Writings and Discourses of John Taylor, Discourses of Wilford Woodruff, Teachings of Lorenzo Snow, Teachings of George Albert Smith, Teachings of Harold B. Lee, Teachings of Spencer W. Kimball, Teachings of Ezra Taft Benson, and Teachings of Howard W. Hunter.

Bookcraft also published some works for BYU Press, the BYU Religious Studies Center, and the LDS Church.

=== Authors ===
During its years as an independent company, Bookcraft published books by many notable LDS figures, including:

- LDS Church presidents and apostles: Ezra Taft Benson, Hugh B. Brown, J. Reuben Clark, Henry B. Eyring, Gordon B. Hinckley, Howard W. Hunter, Spencer W. Kimball, Harold B. Lee, Neal A. Maxwell, Bruce R. McConkie, David O. McKay, Dallin H. Oaks, Boyd K. Packer, Mark E. Petersen, LeGrand Richards, Joseph Fielding Smith, John A. Widtsoe
- Fiction & literature: Gordon T. Allred, Susan Evans McCloud, Carol Lynn Pearson, Jack Weyland, Blaine M. Yorgason, Brenton G. Yorgason
- Scholars & historians: Hyrum L. Andrus, Leonard J. Arrington, Milton V. Backman, Lowell L. Bennion, Susan Easton Black, Eugene England, Richard Neitzel Holzapfel, Milton R. Hunter, Arthur Henry King, Daniel H. Ludlow, N. B. Lundwall, Truman G. Madsen, Robert J. Matthews, Joseph Fielding McConkie, Robert L. Millet, Hugh W. Nibley, Preston Nibley, Stephen E. Robinson, W. Cleon Skousen, Sidney B. Sperry, John W. Welch
- Popular authors: Duane S. Crowther, Paul H. Dunn, George D. Durrant, Richard M. Eyre, Vaughn J. Featherstone, Bruce C. Hafen, Bryant S. Hinckley, Oscar W. McConkie, Chieko Okazaki, Marvin Payne, S. Michael Wilcox
- National figures: Shawn Bradley, Orson Scott Card, Stephen R. Covey, Henry Eyring, Dale Murphy

=== Films ===
Some Bookcraft books have been adapted into movies.

- The Christmas Wish (1998) – CBS made Richard M. Siddoway's novel into a made for TV holiday special. Originally a Bookcraft title, the latest edition was published by Crown Publishers.
- In the Eye of the Storm (2001) – Director Mitch Davis bought the rights to John H. Groberg's 1993 memoir of his Tongan mission and created The Other Side of Heaven, which was distributed by The Walt Disney Company.
- The Work and the Glory (2004–2006) – Gerald N. Lund's very successful historical fiction series about early Mormons was adapted into three movies: The Work and the Glory (2004), The Work and The Glory: American Zion (2005), and The Work and The Glory: A House Divided (2006), distributed by Excel Entertainment Group.

== See also ==
- LDS fiction
