= McConkie =

McConkie is a surname. Notable people with the surname include:

- Bruce R. McConkie (1915–1985), member of the Quorum of the Twelve Apostles of the LDS Church
- David M. McConkie (born 1948), American lawyer and leader in the LDS Church
- Joseph Fielding McConkie (1941–2013), emeritus professor of Ancient Scripture at Brigham Young University
- Oscar W. McConkie (1887–1966), Utah State Senator and leader in the LDS Church
- Oscar W. McConkie, Jr. (1926–2020), American politician and attorney in Utah and leader in the LDS Church

== See also ==
- McConkie Tauasa, rugby league player who plays as a centre or on the wing
