= The Thanksgiving Promise =

- Genre: Drama
- Based on: Chester, I Love You by: Blaine Yorgason; Brenton Yorgason
- Written by: Glen L. Anderson; Peter N. Johnson; Blaine Yorgason; Craig Holyoak
- Directed by: Beau Bridges
- Starring: Beau Bridges; Millie Perkins; Courtney Thorne-Smith; Ed Lauter; Anne Haney; Jason Bateman
- Music by: Bruce Broughton
- Country of origin: United States
- Original language: English

Production
- Executive producer: Mel Ferrer
- Producer: Mark H. Ovitz
- Cinematography: Fred J. Koenekamp
- Editor: James T. Heckert
- Running time: 90 minutes
- Production companies: Walt Disney Television; Mark H. Ovitz Productions

Original release
- Network: ABC
- Release: November 23, 1986

The Thanksgiving Promise is a 1986 American drama television film starring and directed by Beau Bridges, based on the 1983 young adult novel Chester, I Love You by Blaine Yorgason and Brenton Yorgason. It was produced by Walt Disney Television, and originally aired November 23, 1986 as a presentation of The Disney Sunday Movie on ABC.

== Plot ==
Travis Tilby leaps into action when neighbor Stewart Larson asks him to mind an ailing goose slated to be part of Thanksgiving dinner. A gentle animal lover, Travis dotes on the bird, feeding it by hand and speaking to it in soothing tones. However, as Thanksgiving nears, Travis has second thoughts about seeing the bird slaughtered, and he appeals to his father, Hank, and others in the community for help in saving the goose.

== Cast ==
- Beau Bridges as Hank Tilby
- Millie Perkins as Lois Tilby
- Courtney Thorne-Smith as Sheryl
- Ed Lauter as Coach Gruniger
- Anne Haney as Mrs. Sudsup
- Beau Dremann as Alec
- Bill Calvert as Jason Tilby
- Jordan Bridges as Travis Tilby
- Jason Bateman as Steve Tilby
- Lloyd Bridges as Stewart Larson
- Jason Naylor as Arnold
- Jessica Puscas as Jenni Tilby
- Joshua Bryant as Sam the Vet
- Zero Hubbard as Jeff
- Tina Caspary as 1st Girl
- Scott Nemes as 1st Boy
- Kiblena Peace as Emily
- Mark Clayman as Tommy
- Dorothy Dean Bridges as Aggie Larson
- Allan Dietrich as Square Dance Caller
- Lucinda Jany as Neighbor Lady
- Leonard P. Geer as Old Man
- Jeff Bridges as Neighbor (uncredited)
