= Senator McConkie =

Senator McConkie may refer to:

- Oscar W. McConkie Jr. (1926–2020), Utah State Senate
- Oscar W. McConkie (1887–1966), Utah State Senate

== See also ==
- Mark McConkey (fl. 2000s–present), New Hampshire State Senate
