= Yorgason =

Yorgason is a surname. Notable people with the surname include:

- Blaine Yorgason (born 1942), American writer, brother of Brenton
- Brenton G. Yorgason (1945–2016), American novelist and writer
