= Avraham Gileadi =

American academic (born 1940)

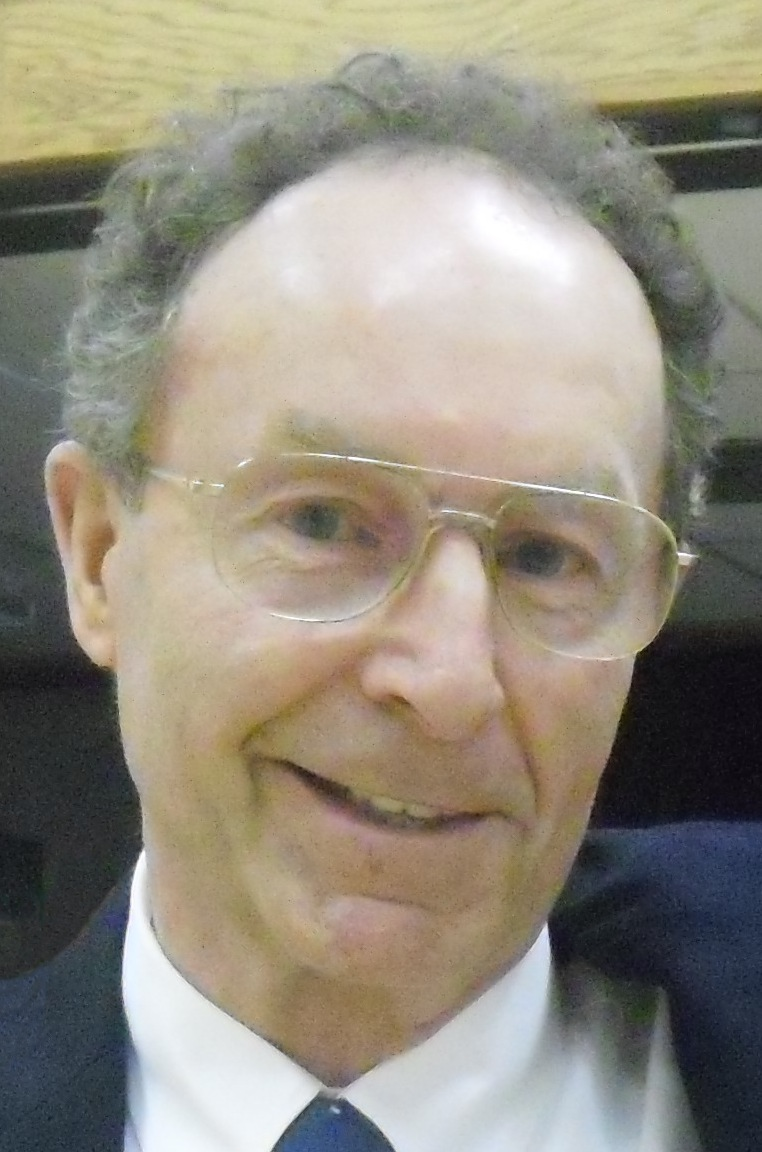
- Born: October 24, 1940 (age 85); The Netherlands
- Education: Brigham Young University (B.A., M.A., Ph.D.)
- Occupation: Author
- Known for: Publications on the Book of Isaiah

Avraham Gileadi (Hebrew: אברהם גילעדי; born October 24, 1940) is a Dutch-born American scholar specializing in the Hebrew language and analysis of the Book of Isaiah. A longtime professor at Brigham Young University, he was one of the "September Six" of prominent scholars excommunicated by the Church of Jesus Christ of Latter-day Saints in 1993, but years later Gileadi was formally readmitted into the church.

== Biography ==
=== Early life and education ===
Gileadi was born in 1940 in the Netherlands during World War II. In the course of the war, his father served in the Dutch resistance whose local chapter helped a New Zealand pilot escape to England. After the war, many emigrated from war-torn Europe to new lands of opportunity. Although his father prospered, idealism led him to emigrate to New Zealand.

In New Zealand, Gileadi went through a period of introspection, reevaluating his priorities and internalizing spiritual principles. After becoming religiously active and involved, he yet "sensed a lack of spiritual fulfillment." Israel's history in the Old Testament became the focus of his attention. He recognized what he believed to be "a partial fulfillment of prophecy in the modern State of Israel," which led to his desire to participate in it.

In 1968, Gileadi left New Zealand to settle in Israel, where he lived five years. Life in Israel soon involved him deeply in the Old Testament and its religious ties to Judaism. He states that "Judaism attracted me because of the unique manner in which the Jews view the Law and the Prophets. Among the Jews, I felt a depth of understanding that, as a Gentile, I had not hitherto known." In Israel, he settled in Jezreel. His studies in Israel also took him to an orthodox religious kibbutz, at which time he was formally received into the Jewish faith and became an Israeli citizen. The climax of his life as an orthodox Jew came when he studied at Yeshivat Hatfutzot, a rabbinic school in Jerusalem. While visiting a library in Israel, the librarian handed him a copy of the Book of Mormon and suggested he read it. Gileadi took the book to be polite and studied it out of curiosity, which led to his conversion to the Church of Jesus Christ of Latter-day Saints. He was baptized a member of the LDS Church in the Pool of Siloam, where the Bible records Jesus healing a blind man by having him wash his eyes in the pool (John 9:5–7). In 1973 Gileadi moved to the United States, where he married and raised a family of nine children.

Gileadi received academic degrees from Brigham Young University: a B.A. in university studies (1975), a M.A. in ancient scripture (1977), and a PhD in ancient studies (1981) with Hugh Nibley as chair. During his academic years, Gileadi taught Hebrew, Religion courses, and an Honors Philosophy class in the literary analysis of the Book of Isaiah. He also sought out and studied with Professor R. K. Harrison, a renowned Old Testament scholar of Wycliffe College, University of Toronto, Canada, who was noted for his conservative theological position.

Being fluent in Hebrew, Gileadi worked with the Hebrew Masoretic Text, the Dead Sea Scroll of Isaiah, and the Septuagint Version to provide a translation of the Book of Isaiah intelligible in English that remains true to the Hebrew. He used lexical tools constantly to accurately convey every nuance of meaning in the original language, finishing his translation of Isaiah during his PhD program.

=== Academic career and church discipline ===
Gileadi was hired by BYU to produce footnotes clarifying translation problems in the Hebrew prophets for the LDS edition of the Bible, and he revised the Hebrew translation of the Book of Mormon for the Church's Translation Division. In 1981 he completed his PhD in ancient studies from Brigham Young University, under the supervision of Hugh Nibley, with a dissertation entitled "A Bifid Division of the Book of Isaiah".

In 1988 Gileadi published The Book of Isaiah: A New Translation with Interpretive Keys from the Book of Mormon, followed in 1991 by The Last Days: Types and Shadows from the Bible and the Book of Mormon. Prominent LDS scholars including Hugh Nibley, Truman G. Madsen and Ellis Rasmussen praised his work. However, Gileadi's argument (present in both books and developed at length in the second) that the Isaiah prophecies pointed mainly to a human "Davidic king" who would emerge in the last days, apart from Jesus Christ, clashed with prevailing interpretations of Isaiah, both LDS and among broader Christianity. Bruce D. Porter, a reviewer in the Review of Books on the Book of Mormon, while praising Gileadi's erudition and the beauty of his translation, noted that Gileadi's "[...] interpretation of Isaiah [...] diverges widely from previous Latter-day Saint commentary on Isaiah, including that of Bruce R. McConkie," and the prophets within the Book of Mormon who quote Isaiah. Further, the reviewer contrasted McConkie's commentary in The Millennial Messiah with Gileadi's interpretation of Isaiah, and pointed out that Gileadi had failed to even mention the prevailing point of view or contrasting research.

Gileadi was counselled by a regional authority of the church to stop giving lectures and seminars, which he did. On September 15, 1993, Gileadi was excommunicated for apostasy from the LDS Church by his local stake presidency. Gileadi told the Deseret News that his stance became, "I will repent of whatever was wrong with me and forgive whoever wronged me. ... Excommunicated or not, everyone needs to repent - and forgive", adding that the excommunication never left him with a desire to rebel against the church.

On February 27, 1996, Gileadi was re-baptized into the church, which is distinct from the reversal of church discipline on appeal. This occurred due in part to the oversight of Neal A. Maxwell. Gileadi later told the Salt Lake Tribune: "In my case — not a single charge was true or supported by evidence — and all mention of it was expunged from the church's records," as is standard practice following rebaptism.

=== Later life ===
Since his rebaptism Gileadi has continued to publish, primarily on the book of Isaiah, promoting his books through the Isaiah Institute. He also continues to lecture and appear on podcasts. His "Davidic King" or "Davidic Servant" viewpoint still figures prominently in his writing and speaking.

Brian David Mitchell, who was convicted in 2011 for the 2002 kidnapping and rape of Elizabeth Smart, believed himself to be the fore-ordained angel born on earth to be the "Davidic Servant". Mitchell's belief in such an end-times figure – also known among many fundamentalist Latter Day Saints as "the One Mighty and Strong" – appeared to be based in part on a reading of Isaiah by Gileadi, with whom Mitchell became familiar as a result of his previous participation in Sterling Allan's American Study Group.

Gileadi moved to Sequim, Washington, in 2013 in his retirement.

== Works ==
Gileadi is the author of over ten books, a majority of them on the Book of Isaiah. He continues to research the writings of Isaiah and related scriptural texts.

- Israel's Apostasy and Restoration: Essays in Honor of Roland K. Harrison (Grand Rapids, MI: Baker Book House, 1988). Twenty-four essays by evangelical and LDS scholars, edited by Avraham Gileadi. Hardcover ISBN 978-0-8010-3830-3.
- The Book of Isaiah: A New Translation with Interpretive Keys from the Book of Mormon (Salt Lake City, UT, Deseret Book: first edition 1988; San Diego, CA: Hebron Books, second edition 2012). A beginner's guide to the Book of Isaiah for LDS readers. Softcover ISBN 9780875790763.
- The Last Days: Types and Shadows from the Bible and the Book of Mormon with foreword by Hugh Nibley (Salt Lake City, UT: Deseret Book, first edition 1991; Salt Lake City, UT: Argon Press, second edition 1998). For LDS readers: "Everything you always wanted to know about the gospel but were too lazy to find out"—Hugh Nibley. Softcover ISBN 9780875792873.
- The Literary Message of Isaiah (San Diego, CA: Hebraeus Press, first edition 1994; second edition 2012). A literary approach to analyzing Isaiah's writings for Judeo-Christian readers. ISBN 9780962664311.
- The End from the Beginning: The Apocalyptic Vision of Isaiah with Isaiah Translation (San Diego, CA: Hebraeus Press, first edition 1997; second edition 2012). A layman's introduction to Isaiah's prophetic message for Judeo-Christian readers.
- Isaiah Decoded: Ascending the Ladder to Heaven (San Diego, CA: Hebraeus Press, first edition 2002; second edition 2012). A comprehensive overview of Isaiah's prophetic message for Judeo-Christian readers. Softcover ISBN 9780910511070.
- Studies in the Book of Mormon (San Diego, CA: Hebron Books, first edition 2005; second edition 2012). Study guide for LDS readers. Softcover ISBN 1560850272.
- Analytical Commentary of Isaiah (San Diego, CA: Hebraeus Press, 2006. 30-hour MP3 audio format).
- The Book of Isaiah: Analytical Translation with Comprehensive Concordance (San Diego, CA: Hebraeus Press, 2012). A modern English rendering of the Book of Isaiah from the Hebrew Masoretic Text with a comprehensive concordance for facilitating word studies for Judeo-Christian readers. ISBN 9780910511148.
- Apocalyptic Commentary of the Book of Isaiah, Part One (San Diego, CA: Hebraeus Press, 2012). A verse-by-verse analysis of Isaiah's end-time prophecy of Isaiah 1–35 for Judeo-Christian readers. ISBN 9780910511292.
- Endtime Prophecy: A Judeo-Mormon Analysis (San Diego, CA: Hebraeus Press, 2018). His final major work, an analysis to help modern readers understand promises and pitfalls of understanding or ignoring the word of God. For Judeo-Christian readers. ISBN 9780910511186.
