= Kirton McConkie =

American Law Firm representing the Church of Jesus Christ of Latter-day Saints

- No. of offices: 3 (2022)
- No. of attorneys: 135 (2022)
- Revenue: US$54.5 million (2017)
- Date founded: 1964; 62 years ago
- Founder: Wilford 'Bill' Kirton Jr. and Oscar W. McConkie Jr.
- Website: www.kmclaw.com

Kirton McConkie is an American law firm headquartered in Salt Lake City, Utah. It is the largest law firm in Utah, and it has long served as the external legal counsel for The Church of Jesus Christ of Latter-day Saints (LDS Church). It was ranked the 300th largest law firm in the United States in 2022 by the National Law Journal.

== History ==
The firm was founded by Wilford "Bill" Kirton Jr. and Oscar W. McConkie Jr. in 1964. Later it added partner B. Lloyd Poelman and for a brief time became known around 1990 as Kirton McConkie & Poelman, before Poelman was convicted of soliciting a prostitute after which the name reverted back. In October 1990, the firm grew to 51 attorneys, and moved to a larger space from 330 South 300 East to the 17th and 18th floors of Eagle Gate Tower in downtown Salt Lake City.

In 2012, due to its status as the LDS Church's law firm, Kirton McConkie was given the first option to lease the lone office building in the newly constructed City Creek Center, the $1.5 billion mixed-use development of the LDS Church. At the dedication ceremony, the Church's general counsel Lance B. Wickman noted that "it's not really the building we're dedicating, it's . . . us, in our devotion, in our service, giving the best that we have to give in our professional capacity, realizing that in doing so we are not just representing another client, but we are representing the church of Jesus Christ himself."

== Notable cases and actions ==
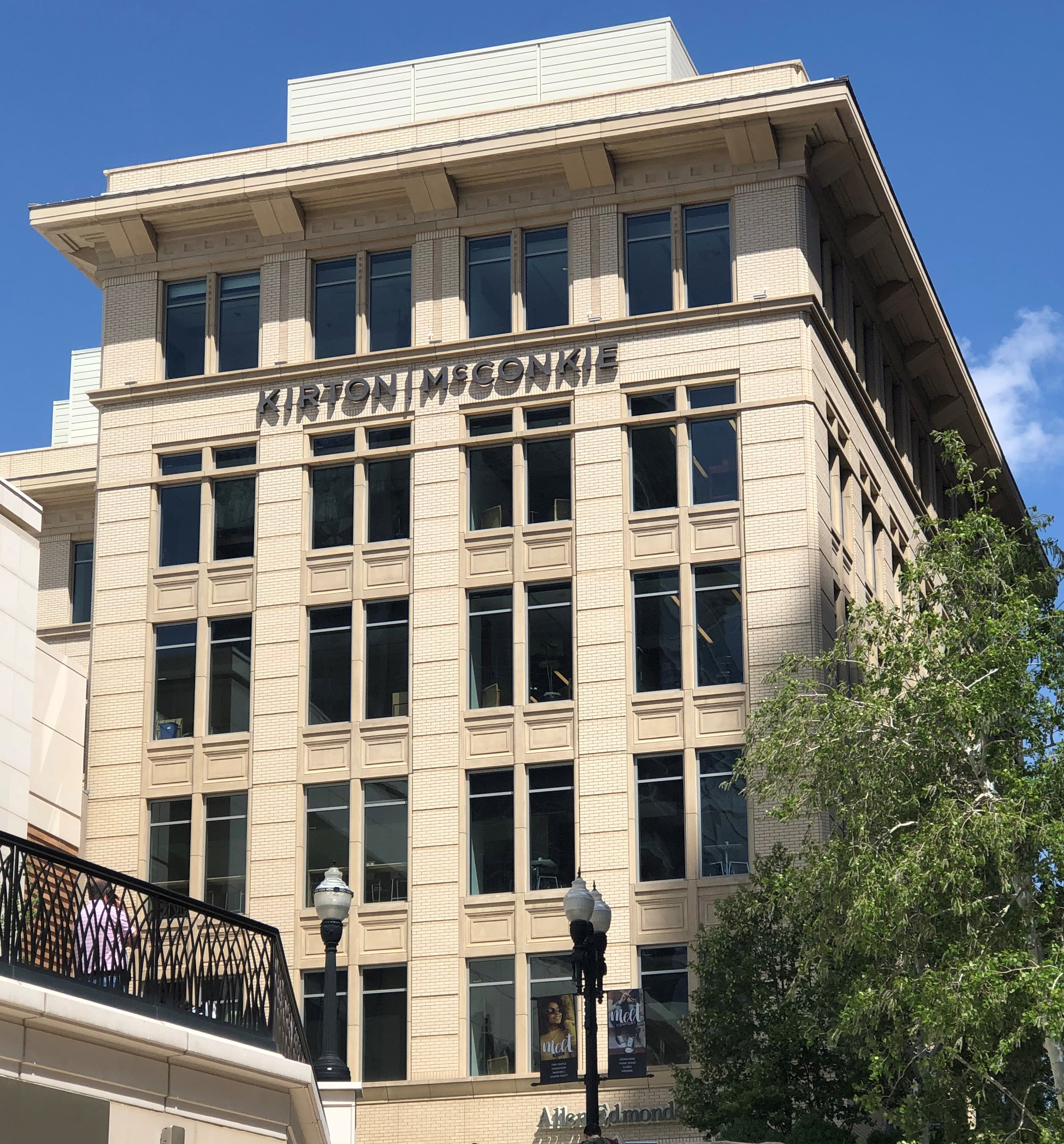
Kirton McConkie building in downtown Salt Lake City, Utah. Dedicated in 2012 by LDS Church apostle Dallin H. Oaks.

- 1975 policy on LDS Church employment of mothers - Prior to 1975, the LDS Church had a policy that a woman's employment was terminated upon the birth of her first child. Kirton McConkie formed a legal opinion that the LDS Church would not win a case if challenged on its policy, that contributed to a change in policy, with a few exceptions for some religious education positions which were maintained until 2014.
- 1999 Intellectual Reserve, Inc. v. Utah Lighthouse Ministry, Inc. – A United States district court decision on the subject of deep linking and contributory infringement of copyright. Kirton McConkie, representing the LDS Church, argued that a critical website could not post internet links to other websites that had text from its copyrighted material. The district court issued a permanent injunction that forbid the website from displaying the copyrighted material and from posting internet links of any websites that hosted any of the material.
- 2001 Leonard Arrington papers - Upon his death, former LDS Church historian Leonard Arrington left his papers and diaries to Utah State University. The LDS Church through Kirton McConkie filed an injunction, saying that the LDS Church had "ironclad" ownership of 400,000 of 710,000 documents. This sparked a broad controversy in the academic community that the LDS Church was attempting to suppress embarrassing historical documents.
- 2018 Utah Medical Cannabis Act initiative - The LDS Church released a seven-page memo compiled by Kirton McConkie with thirty-one reasons the Church opposed the ballot initiative.
- 2019 LDS Church resignation intermediary - Between 2015 and 2019, members of the LDS Church who wished to resign their membership without direct church interaction were using a website called QuitMormon, run by a lawyer who acted as an intermediary. In 2019, the LDS Church changed its policy and now requires notarized resignation requests be sent through Kirton McConkie due to what Kirton McConkie says were "fraudulent requests."
- 2021 James Huntsman fraud lawsuit - Disaffected LDS Church member James Huntsman file a federal suit accusing the LDS Church of misleading its members in spending donations meant for charitable causes on commercial enterprises. Kirton McConkie represented the LDS Church. The district court ruled against Huntsman, who appealed to the 9th Circuit. A 3-judge panel reversed the district court, but that ruling was vacated when the circuit agreed to an en banc rehearing. The en banc panel affirmed the district court and dismissed the lawsuit.
- 2021 Lori Daybell alleged misrepresentation - The attorney for Lori Daybell, accused of murdering her children, alleged that Kirton McConkie received a phone call from Daybell and misrepresented his position, giving the impression that she had attorney client privilege. Daybell's attorney allege that a Kirton McConkie attorney then called prosecutors and divulged information that Daybell felt was shared in confidence.
- 2022 LDS Church sex abuse hotline - The Associated Press reported that Kirton McConkie operates a helpline that local ecclesiastical leaders are required to call before reporting abuse to law enforcement. Victims of abuse have sued the LDS Church, asserting that Kirton McConkie too often counsels ecclesiastical leaders to not report abuse to law enforcement due to being more concerned with avoiding costly lawsuits than the wellbeing of victims. The LDS Church disputed the accusation that their policies discourage helping victims.
- 2022 Barre Seid political donation - Kirton McConkie was one of three law firms that facilitated one of the largest, if not the largest single contribution ever made to a politically focused non-profit. To enable the transfer of $1.6 billion, a 501(c)4 organization named the Marble Freedom Trust was created to allow for a tax free transfer.

== Notable attorneys and alumni ==
- Greg Bell - Seventh lieutenant governor of Utah
- Charles W. Dahlquist II - tenth national commissioner of the BSA
- Von G. Keetch - Former general authority of the LDS Church
- David M. McConkie - Member of the general presidency of the Sunday School of the LDS Church
- Oscar W. McConkie Jr. - Founding member and prominent Democratic politician in Utah
- Merrill Nelson - Member of the Utah House of Representatives
- B. Lloyd Poelman - Excommunicated LDS Church leader and anti-pornography advocate convicted of soliciting a prostitute.
