= Evidences and Reconciliations =

1943 book by John A. Widtsoe

Evidences and Reconciliations: Aids to Faith in a Modern Day
- Volume III
- Author: John A. Widtsoe
- Language: English
- Publisher: Bookcraft
- Publication date: 1943
- Publication place: United States

Evidences and Reconciliations: Aids to Faith in a Modern Day is a Mormon apologetic book by John A. Widtsoe. Originally published in 1943 by Bookcraft, the book was a reprint of Widtsoe's column of the same name, which regularly appeared in Improvement Era, an official magazine of the Church of Jesus Christ of Latter-day Saints (LDS Church). Widtsoe was a scientist and an apostle of the LDS Church.

The first edition of Evidences and Reconciliations contained Widtsoe first 68 columns, which generally consisted of answers to reader questions on difficult or challenging doctrinal matters. The first edition was published in three separate volumes.

The book became popular within the LDS Church and has been republished several times. A three-volumes-in-one edition edited by G. Homer Durham was first published in 1960.
