= David M. McConkie =

American religious leader

David Merrill McConkie (born October 13, 1948) is an American lawyer and was a member of the general presidency of the Sunday School of the Church of Jesus Christ of Latter-day Saints (LDS Church) from 2009 to 2014.

McConkie was raised in Bountiful, Utah. From 1969 to 1971 he was a missionary for the LDS Church in South Africa. He attended the University of Utah and earned a bachelor's degree in history and a Juris Doctor.

McConkie became a lawyer at the Salt Lake City firm of Kirton McConkie, the firm that represents the LDS Church in legal matters. (One of the founding partners of the firm was Oscar W. McConkie Jr., who is a relative of David M. McConkie.)

In the LDS Church, McConkie has been a bishop and a stake president. At the April 2009 general conference of the LDS Church, McConkie was accepted as the first counselor to Russell T. Osguthorpe in the general presidency of the church's Sunday School.

McConkie and his wife are the parents of seven children. He lives in North Salt Lake, Utah.

== Publications ==
- David M. McConkie, "Learning to Hear and Understand the Spirit", Liahona, Feb. 2011
- David M. McConkie, "Gospel Learning and Teaching", Liahona, Nov. 2010
