= Leonard J. Arrington =

American Mormon historian (1917–1999)

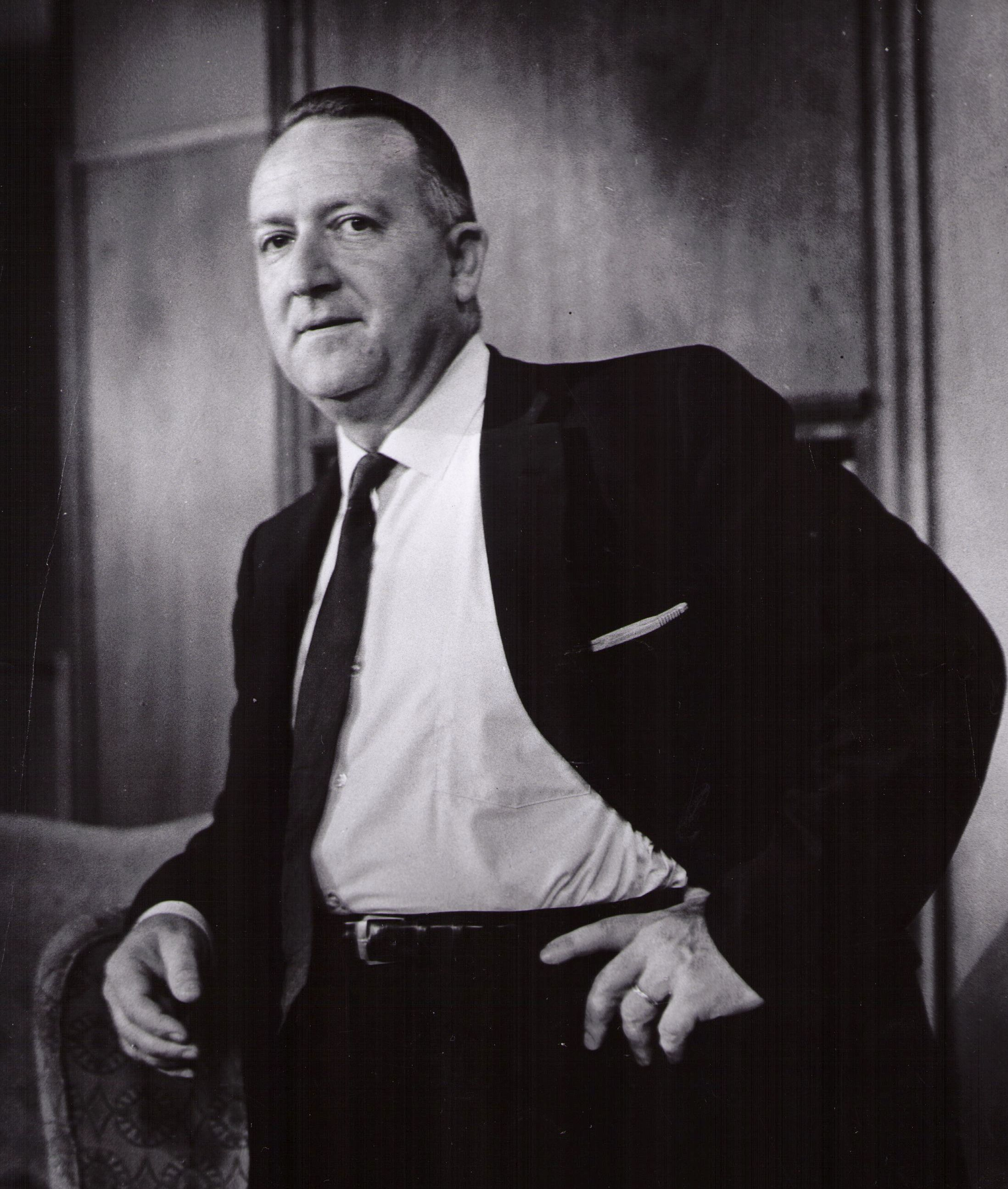
- Arrington in the 1950s

Church Historian
- January 1972 – February 1982
- Predecessor: Howard W. Hunter

Personal details
- Born: Leonard James Arrington; July 2, 1917; Twin Falls, Idaho, U.S.
- Died: February 11, 1999 (aged 81); Salt Lake City, Utah, U.S.
- Cause of death: Heart failure
- Resting place: Logan City Cemetery
- Known For: Writings in Mormon history
- Education: UNC-Chapel Hill, PhD; University of Idaho
- Occupation: Historian; author; professor
- Employer: Utah State University; Brigham Young University
- Spouse(s): Grace Fort (m. 1942; died 1982); Harriett Ann Horne (m. 1983)
- Children: 3

Leonard James Arrington (July 2, 1917 – February 11, 1999) was an American author, academic and the founder of the Mormon History Association (MHA). He is known as the "Dean of Mormon History" and "the Father of Mormon History" because of his contributions to the field. From 1972 to 1982, he was Church Historian for the Church of Jesus Christ of Latter-day Saints (LDS Church), the first non-general authority to fill the assignment since it began in 1842. He was director of the Joseph Fielding Smith Institute for Church History from 1982 until 1986.

"As a result of yesterday's meeting with the First Presidency I have been thinking and praying about my calling as Church Historian. This was also prompted by the necessity of writing an article appraising President Joseph Fielding Smith as a historian. On the one hand, I am the Church Historian and must seek to build testimonies, spread the word, build the Kingdom. On the other hand, I am called to be a historian, which means that I must earn the respect of professional historians—what I write must be craftsmanlike, credible, and of good quality. This means that I stand on two legs—the leg of faith and the leg of reason."
— Leonard J. Arrington (diary, August 1972)

Arrington grew up in a large family in Idaho, where he and his family were members of the LDS Church. After high school, he studied agricultural economics at the University of Idaho (U of I) and continued studying economics at the University of North Carolina at Chapel Hill (UNC). While teaching at the Utah State Agricultural College (later Utah State University (USU)) in Logan, Utah, Harvard University Press (HUP) published his book Great Basin Kingdom: An Economic History of the Latter-day Saints, 1830–1900 in 1958. After a Fulbright professorship at the University of Genoa in Italy, Arrington raised funds to pay for research and writing on Mormon biographies. He taught Western American History at Brigham Young University (BYU) from 1972 to 1987.

In conjunction with his teaching appointment at BYU, Arrington was also appointed as the first Church Historian for the LDS Church from 1972 to 1982. It was the first time a professional historian was given this job. Arrington and his team of researchers, forming the Church Historical Department, began many projects to document LDS Church history, ranging from articles for the church's official magazine to scholarly books written for a non-LDS audience. The Historical Department was not subject to the church's Correlation Program and enjoyed some freedom of research. However, over time, various church members and apostles disliked the historical articles. The new director of the Historical Department, G. Homer Durham, required that all publications go through him and halted the hiring of new employees. In 1982, the LDS Church released Arrington as Church Historian and transferred the History Division to BYU, creating the Joseph Fielding Smith Institute for Church History. Arrington published over 20 books and articles, including several biographies, with the help of many research assistants.

Arrington donated his research and personal papers to USU and also donated microfilms of his pre-1982 diaries to the LDS Church Archives, with the condition that the diaries not be read until 25 years after his death. However, the LDS Church broke the agreement when shortly after Arrington's death they argued that they owned part of the collection, and asked Arrington's daughter to excise portions of Arrington's diary. After legal negotiation, half of a box of the collection was given to the LDS Church Archives.

== Early life ==
Leonard Arrington was born in Twin Falls, Idaho on July 2, 1917, the third of eleven children. His parents, Noah and Edna, were farmers and devout Latter-day Saints, the largest and most well-known branch of Mormonism. Arrington grew up as an aspiring farmer and active member and one of the first national officers of the National FFA Organization. For his FFA independent project, he raised several hundred Rhode Island Red chickens and won a prize for them at the Idaho State Fair in 1934. The chicken project helped him win a Union Pacific Railroad scholarship.

Arrington was also a member of the Boy Scouts and read books by Ernest Thompson Seton, naturalist co-founder of the Boy Scouts. In the summers, he slept outside in the family orchard to have a quiet place to read and enjoyed an idyllic country life. On one evening observing nature, Arrington had a transcendent experience where he felt "an intimate kinship with the world" which he said "made it easy for me [...] to integrate personal religious experiences and intuitions with the more formal affirmations, practices, forms, and ceremonies of the organized church."

During the Great Depression, Arrington was curious about the price of potatoes and set about his first economic experiment. He put slips of paper in some of the sacks of potatoes his family harvested, with the information that the potatoes were sold for five cents per hundred pound sack and requested that the recipient tell him the price they paid via his address. Several people responded, and one person had paid two dollars for the same sack of potatoes.

== Education ==
Arrington's father offered to pay for Arrington to serve as an LDS Church missionary, but not for a university education. Arrington did not serve an LDS mission, but considered his educational endeavors a form of church service. Under a scholarship to the U of I, Arrington studied agricultural science in 1935, later changing to agricultural economics. George S. Tanner, the director of the LDS Institute at the U of I, was a progressive intellectual Mormon who taught Arrington that Christianity and science could be compatible and that other translations of the Bible could assist in its interpretation. One of the university's newest economics professors, Erwin Graue, taught the ideas of Alfred Marshall and influenced Arrington to see economics as a study of human relationships and not just mathematical economic forces. Marshall wrote that religious fervor could influence people to act altruistically.

Arrington graduated cum laude and Phi Beta Kappa in 1939. Arrington then began graduate work under a Kenan teaching fellowship at UNC. and married Grace Fort in 1942. She joined the LDS Church in 1946.

In World War II, he served in the Army in North Africa and Italy from 1942 to 1945. He worked in the prisoner-of-war (POW) processing division and for Italy's Institute of Statistics. While stationed at a POW camp for Italian prisoners in North Africa, Arrington reported having another transcendent experience after reading The Brothers Karamazov. He reported feeling that God wanted him to become a teacher and a writer about religion and economics.

== Academic career ==
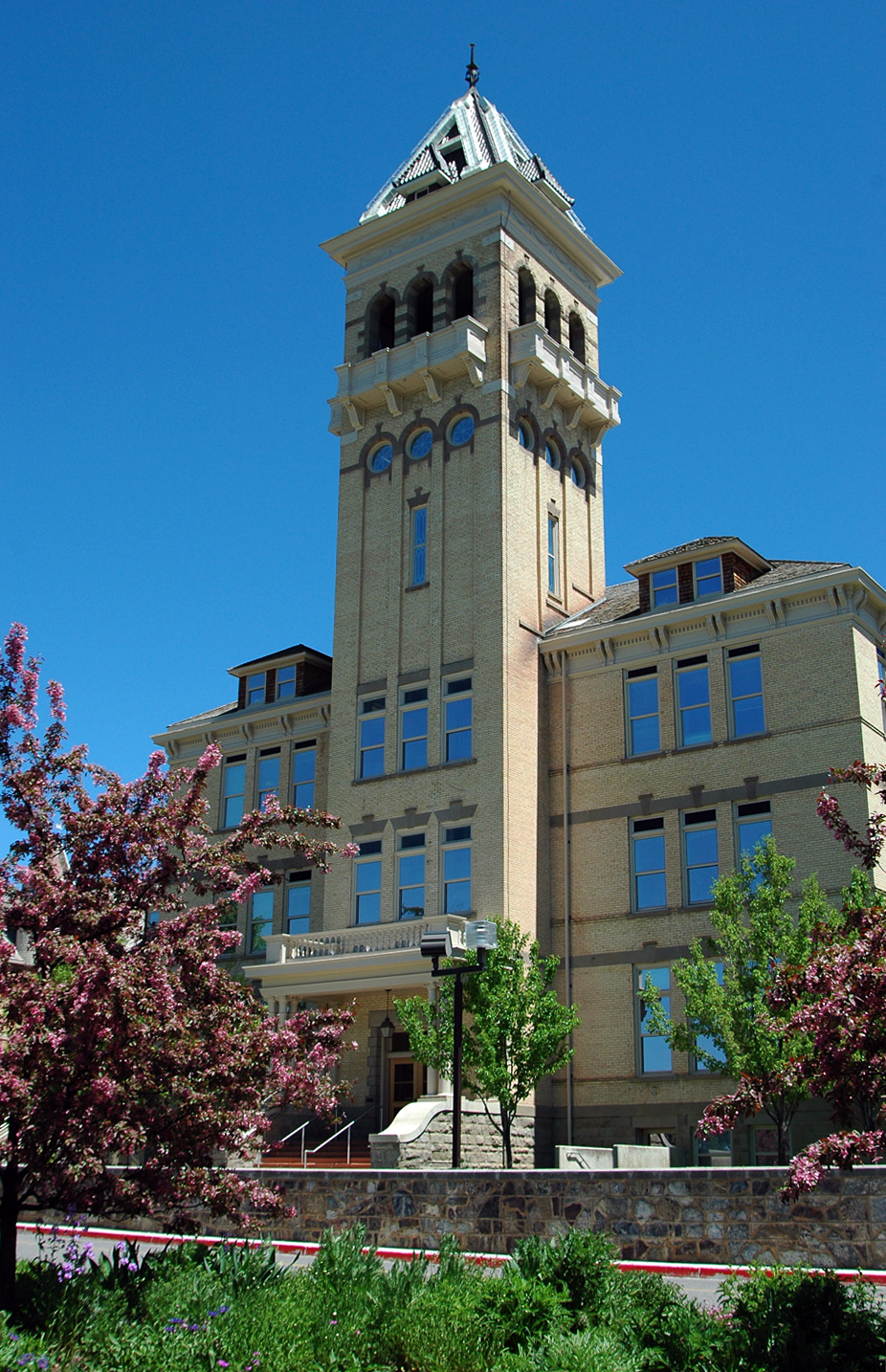
Utah State University

He was a professor at Utah State Agricultural College in Logan, Utah (which became USU in 1957) from 1946 to 1972. He completed a PhD in economics at UNC in 1952, taking a year's leave from teaching and moving to North Carolina to complete his coursework. Arrington easily completed the coursework and examinations, as he had already been teaching much of the material and published several articles in the meantime.

In 1958, the HUP published Arrington's Great Basin Kingdom: An Economic History of the Latter-day Saints, 1830–1900, based on his doctoral dissertation, Mormon Economic Policies and Their Implementation on the Western Frontier, 1847–1900. Great Basin Kingdom was published through a grant from the Rockefeller Foundation, which subsidized publication of books about economic history. Under the grant, all royalties went back into the fund to help publish more books; Arrington did not receive royalties from the book until the University of Utah reprinted it in 1993.

Arrington completed much of the research for Great Basin Kingdom in the LDS Church's library archives. Aware of the hostile relationship the archives had at the time with academic research, Arrington took John A. Widtsoe's advice and started his research with published materials and theses, working up to unpublished materials. Arrington was able to circumvent A. William Lund's policy of personally approving all notes taken in the archives: Arrington took his notes on a typewriter using carbon copy paper, enabling him to leave a copy with Lund and take his own copy home. In order to rewrite his dissertation into Great Basin Kingdom, Arrington took a sabbatical in 1956 and 1957 and was granted a fellowship at the Huntington Library in San Marino, California.

In Great Basin Kingdom, Arrington traces the Mormon pioneer practices of "central planning, organized cooperation, and the partial socialization of investment implicit in Mormon theory" to the democratic theory of the Founding Fathers of the United States. Arrington also noted that pioneers found religious significance in creating farms out of previously wild land, making irrigation central to their way of life. The way Mormons freely distributed irrigation water—through a central canal and diverted when needed—reflected their communal values. While the Mormon cooperative economy died out in the 1880s, their cooperative spirit anticipated later governmental planning. Great Basin Kingdom's thorough documentation called attention to previously hidden sources in the LDS Church Archives. Dean L. May and Donald Worster criticized Great Basin Kingdom for overreaching its thesis that organized irrigation could rejuvenate a culture. One biographer attributes Arrington's overvaluing Mormon achievements to a lack of empirical studies on pioneer settlements at the time. Still, the book was received as an instant classic that raised the standard for Mormon scholarship. Dale L. Morgan, though critical of the lack of attention to the Gentile (i.e., non-Mormon) influence on Mormons, said that it was an indispensable ordering of Mormon data. The book is still considered one of the significant books on Mormon history.

From 1958 to 1959, he was a Fulbright Professor of American Economics at the University of Genoa in Italy. After returning from Italy, Arrington arranged for donations from patrons to fund the writing of Mormon biographies. Much of these biographies were researched and written by graduate students and other assistants, but published under Arrington's name with acknowledgements of the student work. Also in 1959, Arrington wrote an article featured in the first issue of BYU Studies entitled "An Economic Interpretation of 'The Word of Wisdom.'" The article argued that Brigham Young's enforcement of the Word of Wisdom as a commandment was motivated by a desire to keep cash inside Utah (and not spent on luxury imports). BYU Studies was suspended for a year, which Ernest L. Wilkinson told Arrington was because of his revisionist history paper.

From 1966 to 1967 he worked as a visiting professor of history at the University of California, Los Angeles. From 1972 to 1987 he was Lemuel H. Redd Jr. Professor of Western American History at BYU. In 1977, he received an honorary Doctor of Humane Letters from the U of I (his alma mater), and in 1982 USU awarded him an Honorary Doctor of Humanities degree.

=== Historical associations ===
Arrington helped establish the MHA in 1965 and served as its first president from 1966 to 1967. After Arrington's article caused the suspension of BYU studies, it became wary of publishing any controversial material. Arrington formed the MHA in part to make a place where controversial material could be discussed. The association welcomed anyone with an interest in Mormon history. Wesley Johnson attended the inaugural meeting and proposed that the association could publish Mormon studies articles in Dialogue: A Journal of Mormon Thought, a publication he helped form. Johnson's proposal was accepted and members of the Mormon History Association submitted papers to Dialogue.

Arrington also founded the Western Historical Quarterly and served as president of the Western History Association (1968–69), the Agricultural History Society (1969–70), and the Pacific Coast Branch of the American Historical Association (1981–82). For his distinction in writing American history he was awarded the Western History Association Prize in 1984 and he was made a Fellow of the Society of American Historians in 1986.

== LDS Church Historian and Church History Division ==
=== Appointment ===
N. Eldon Tanner was made second counselor to LDS Church president David O. McKay, in 1963. Tanner met with the director of the BYU library at the time, S. Lyman Tyler, to coordinate the work of LDS historians with the LDS Church Archives. Arrington began attending these meetings in 1966.

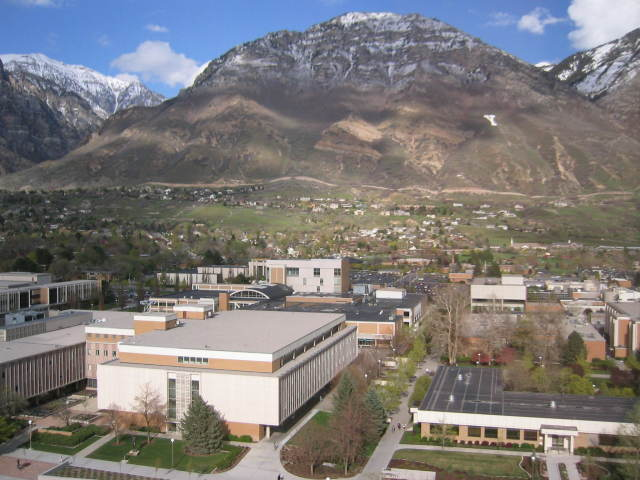
Arrington's office was in the Harold B. Lee Library from 1972 to 1980

After McKay died in 1970, the LDS Church Historian, Joseph Fielding Smith, succeeded him as church president. This left the position of official Church Historian—which was traditionally held by a member of the Quorum of the Twelve Apostles—vacant. Apostle Howard W. Hunter was chosen as the next Church Historian, and he formed a committee of prominent Mormon historians to discuss reorganizing the Church History Department. As part of this reorganization, Arrington was appointed LDS Church Historian, replacing Hunter, in January 1972. At the same time, Arrington was appointed as "Lemuel H. Redd Professor of Western History" and Founding Director of the "Charles Redd Center for Western Studies" at BYU; his historian position was funded half by the church and half by BYU. The Church Historian's Office was transformed into the church's Historical Department, and Arrington was made director of its research-oriented History Division. It was the first time a professional historian rather than an administrator was given a church historian position. He hired Jim Allen and Davis Bitton as assistant church historians, whose positions were also funded half by the church and half by their universities.

Arrington and his assistants were supported by a team of editors, administrative assistants, research historians, oral history experts, and student interns. It was common for many individuals to work on a project; generally the principal author was listed in the article's byline, but sometimes Arrington's name was used to lend a publication authority. As a supervisor, Arrington was not a skillful bureaucrat, and junior staffers complained about their exclusion from decision-making and a lack of communication, which Arrington tried to ameliorate. Richard Bushman, a prominent Mormon historian, suggested that Arrington commission a multivolume history of the church, written mostly by scholars outside the history division staff. William Hartley, Gordon Irving, and Gary Shumway began an oral history program, funded by a grant from the descendants of James Moyle, a Utah politician. A summer research fellowship offered $1000 for outside scholars to use the LDS Church Archives for projects on Mormon history. Eugene England Sr. also donated money to support projects that Arrington deemed especially important. Additionally, a special Mormon History Trust Fund was formed from individual donations, including royalties donated by staff members.

=== The Story of the Latter-day Saints ===
During his time in the office, Arrington sponsored authors to write academic LDS Church histories. Among the best known works from this "New Mormon History" were two general church histories, one aimed at LDS Church members, The Story of the Latter-day Saints, and one for interested outsiders, The Mormon Experience: A History of the Latter-day Saints. Arrington also granted liberal access to church archival material to both Mormon and non-Mormon scholars. Arrington continued to professionalize the archives with the systematic cataloging started by Joseph Fielding Smith. This era is sometimes referred to as "Camelot" due to its open and idealistic ethos. The division's output was not subject to the LDS Church's Correlation Program. The Correlation Program edited officially published church materials, like instruction manuals and magazines, to ensure that they presented a consistent message that LDS Church authorities agreed on. Arrington, Bitton, Allen, and Maureen Beecher served as a reading committee for the division's writings in place of formal Correlation approval. Arrington wanted to avoid the Correlation Program, stating that "I do not think we could determine the truth of what had happened in history by having the Quorum of the Twelve vote on it."

=== Mounting resistance ===
The open and idealistic ethos did not last. The History Division's immediate supervisors, Joseph Anderson and G. Homer Durham, failed to defend the division. Employees within the department, under the instruction of Mark E. Petersen, compiled what they believed to be heretical statements and passed them along to the Twelve and ultimately the offender's bishop. In a 1973 meeting with the First Presidency, church president Harold B. Lee rejected proposals for a student research award and for a Friends of the Church History organization. Lee preferred that researchers clear sensitive archive research topics like polygamy with the First Presidency ahead of time. Staff historian D. Michael Quinn published an article in the LDS Church magazine, the Ensign, exploring the origins of the office of presiding bishop, and asserted that Edward Partridge was not the first incumbent. Although Quinn's research was correct, space in the Ensign did not permit a complete documentation of Quinn's research, and some readers felt the article insulted Partridge's memory. Apostle Spencer W. Kimball suggested that Arrington submit an apology to readers; Arrington sent a message to the publisher with his regrets that the article's format was unfortunate.

While many readers praised the division's publications, some members criticized the new histories. In a meeting with institute teachers, Ezra Taft Benson, then president of the Twelve, obliquely criticized some of the terms used in The Story of the Latter-day Saints, like "primitivist" and "communitarian". After the publication of Dean C. Jessee's Letters of Brigham Young to His Sons, apostle Boyd K. Packer wrote a letter to the First Presidency objecting to the inclusion of Young's tobacco use and the fact that his descendants were unhappy with the way Young's will was carried out. Packer preferred that a sanitized version be published and believed that the History Division's work ought to be sent through the Correlation Program. However, church president Kimball found The Story of the Latter-day Saints a "great work". A University of Utah undergraduate wrote a research paper connecting the New Mormon History coming from the Church Division with secularism and the work of anti-Mormon historians Jerald and Sandra Tanner. The paper quoted interviews with Mormon historians that were very unlikely to have been real. A copy of the paper reached the Twelve via Mark E. Petersen, and as a result of the ensuing discussion, several LDS historians were barred from publishing in church sources. Other critics were similarly non-confrontational, but had enough influence to constrain and redirect the historical department.

G. Homer Durham, a member of the First Quorum of the Seventy, replaced Joseph Anderson as director of the Historical Department in 1977 and began restraining the History Division's activity. Durham required that all manuscripts go through him for approval before publication. He attempted to combine the Mormon History Trust Fund with the general department budget but was prevented by Arrington. Durham also refrained from hiring new staff members to replace staff who had left. The multi-volume church history project was dropped, allowing the outside authors to seek publishers other than Deseret Book who would give them royalties and not be tempted to sanitize church history. Not all twelve authors completed their projects, but many books that started from the History Division project were later published through other publishers. (Note: The list of books that were published from the multi-volume church history project are as follows: Bushman, Richard (1984). Joseph Smith and the Beginnings of Mormonism. Urbana, Illinois: University of Illinois. ISBN 9780252011436.; Backman, Milton V. (1983). The Heavens Resound: A History of the Latter-day Saints in Ohio. Salt Lake City, Utah: Deseret Book.; Alexander, Thomas G. (1986). Mormonism in Transition: A History of the Latter-day Saints, 1890–1930. Urbana, Illinois: University of Illinois.; Cowan, Richard O. (1985). The Church in the Twentieth Century. Salt Lake City, Utah: Deseret Book.; Britsch, R. Lanier (1986). Unto the Isles of the Sea: A History of the Latter-day Saints in the Pacific. Salt Lake City, Utah: Deseret Book.; — (1990). Mormonism in Hawaii. Salt Lake City, Utah: Deseret Book.; Palmer, Spencer J. (1978). The Expanding Church. Salt Lake City, Utah: Deseret Book.; Tullis, F. LaMond (1987). Mormons in Mexico: The Dynamics of Faith and Culture. Logan, Utah: Utah State University. ISBN 9780874211306.)

=== Departure ===
The church transferred its History Division to BYU in 1982, bringing the era of open LDS Church Archives to a close. Working in a new BYU division, the Joseph Fielding Smith Institute for Church History, brought Arrington into a more static situation, as he no longer divided his time between church headquarters and BYU. In February 1982, he was privately released as Church Historian and director of the History Division. These positions were assumed by Durham, who said that moving the team would save them from the increasing hostility from the Twelve. At the April 1982 general conference, the change was not formally announced and Arrington did not receive the traditional vote of thanks for his service.

In March 1982, Arrington's wife Grace died. In November 1983, Arrington married Harriet Horne, granddaughter of Alice Merrill Horne. Arrington continued on as director of the Joseph Fielding Smith Institute for Church History until 1986 and he retired in 1987. In 2005, the institute was closed and the department's historians were returned to LDS Church Headquarters.

== Other writings ==
Roland Rich Woolley, lawyer for several Hollywood celebrities, funded three biographies by Arrington. The first was a biography of Woolley's father-in-law, William Spry. Woolley first hired popular writer William L. Roper to write the biography, but as the manuscript lacked professionalism, Roper hired Arrington to complete it. The biography focuses disproportionately on Spry's decision to execute Joe Hill, reflecting Woolley's conservative politics in suppressing labor radicalism.

Woolley's choice of subjects for two additional biographies were his grandfathers Charles C. Rich and Edwin D. Woolley. With these biographies, Woolley gave Arrington complete control over the manuscripts. As Arrington was busy with university commitments at the time, he delegated much of the work to other historians, former students, and administrative assistants. The sources on Rich did not provide any introspection or motives for Rich's actions, and his biography had to focus on the events Rich experienced and his faithfulness, deduced from his actions. Edwin Wooley's letters and personal documents were more personable, and his role as financial adviser to Brigham Young made him a more fruitful subject for biography. Rebecca Cornwall wrote most of the book, and Arrington requested that she be named a co-author, but Woolley insisted that only Arrington's name be in the book's byline. From Quaker to Latter-day Saint: Bishop Edwin D. Woolley reflect's Cornwall's literary elegance and boldness in "informed speculation".

Another wealthy family, the Eccles, commissioned Arrington to write a biography of David Eccles, a millionaire who helped form the industrial economy in Utah. David Eccles was a polygamist, and the descendants of his two wives, Bertha Jensen in Ogden and Ellen Stoddard in Logan, did not agree about how the biography should be written. Nora Harrison from the Logan part of the family originally commissioned the biography, but did not own enough material for the necessary research. Cleone Eccles, David's daughter-in-law from the Ogden side of the family, wanted a biography that focused on only positive things about David Eccles, while Harrison wanted a professional, scholarly work. In order to access Cleone Eccles's collection of David Eccles's manuscripts, Harrison agreed to give Cleone the right to make alterations to the text. Arrington employed JoAnn Bair to do the research and first drafts of the work. Harrison was unhappy with the manuscript and paid their neighbor and writer Wallace Stegner to critique the manuscript; his 15-page guidelines advised the writer to engage the reader through cliffhangers, flashbacks, and speculation. Stegner also found the manuscript too gentle on David Eccles's fraudulent business dealings. To appease Harrison, Arrington had Maureen Ursenbach Beecher improve the manuscript's literary style, but the final biography still lacked real criticism of Eccles's business practices.

Spencer W. Kimball suggested that Arrington write a serious biography of Brigham Young, and Arrington paid assistants for the project out of his own pocket, possibly to insulate it from donor influences. Arrington wrote the in-depth biography with help from many of his associates at the History Division. One of Arrington's biographers, Gary Topping, praised the research in Brigham Young: American Moses, but criticized its lack of psychological depth, missing the opportunity to re-examine the Mountain Meadows massacre and how Young's wives were treated.

Arrington also worked on biographies for Harold Silver, Madelyn Silver, and Charles Redd, with funding from their respective families. Arrington also worked on a biography for Alice Merrill Horne.

During research on his dissertation, Arrington found a manuscript from 1946 by Feramorz Fox about Mormon communitarianism. Arrington found the manuscript fascinatingly free of Marxist thought and together with Dean L. May, revised and expanded the manuscript under the title Building the City of God: Community and Cooperation among the Mormons. Deseret Book published the book in 1976. The book was received poorly at LDS Church Headquarters; Deseret Book was not allowed to reprint the book and Church News was not permitted to review it. Fellow historians found the book well-researched but too willing to give Mormonism credit for modern welfare programs.

== Death and legacy ==
Arrington remained an active and devoted member of the LDS Church throughout his life. In 1982, his wife Grace Fort died, and in 1983 Arrington was remarried to Harriett Ann Horne. On February 11, 1999, at the age of 81, Arrington died of heart failure at his home in Salt Lake City.

Starting in 1999 after his death, the MHA created the annual Leonard J. Arrington Award, awarded for distinguished and meritorious service to Mormon history. In 2002 he was posthumously awarded the first annual Lifetime Achievement Award by the John Whitmer Historical Association. In 2005, Utah State University created the Leonard J. Arrington Chair in Mormon History and Culture, which was sponsored by more than 45 donors. This chair is the first position at a public institution specifically for the study of Mormon history and culture. In Fall 2007, this chair was first filled by Philip Barlow. The university hosts the Leonard J. Arrington Mormon History Lecture Series, in which Arrington himself gave the inaugural lecture in 1995.

=== The Leonard Arrington Papers ===
Prior to his death, Arrington's long history and family ties influenced his decision to donate his papers to Utah State University. After the papers opened to the public in October 2001, a small group of Church Historical Department staff began reading through the collection for over three weeks. Thereafter, a law firm (Kirton and McConkie) hired by the Church Historical Department claimed the church owned up to 60% of the materials in the Arrington Papers due to their relevance to Arrington's tenure as Church Historian, which would have been approximately 400,000 of the 700,000 items in the collection. Kirton and McConkie issued an injunction against using the Arrington Papers' use, and in early November 2001 a lawsuit seemed possible. However, Gordon B. Hinckley, church president, shifted the interaction toward negotiation when he called USU president Kermit Hall and assured him the church would issue no lawsuits. During the course of negotiations, the church revised its request to about 200,000 items. However, USU archivists believed the church could claim ownership only over the Council of Twelve minutes in the papers, less than one-half of one-percent of the total collection.

The church eventually agreed to accepting that amount when it came out during the course of negotiations that church staff had read portions of Arrington's diary. In addition to giving the originals of his diaries to USU, Arrington had given microfilm of his diary from his boyhood until 1982 to the Church Archives, but with the condition that his diaries not be read until 25 years after his death. However, shortly after Arrington's death, a general authority asked Arrington's daughter, Susan Madsen, to excise 40 entries from her father's diary; Arrington's family concluded church staff had read his journals before the request time had elapsed and without proper permission. George Daines, the Arrington family attorney, explained that the family had grounds to take legal action against the LDS Church, and the negotiations soon ended with the church accepting the Arrington family's terms. Arrington's family agreed to give the LDS Church some of the materials, including minutes to meetings with the Twelve Apostles and materials related to the temple ceremony. As for the 40 diary entries, the church dropped the request after an unnamed apostle read the chosen entries and concluded they were unproblematic.

Before his passing, Arrington's children convinced their father to decrease the amount of time before making his diaries available from 25 years to 10 years. The diaries were made available in September 2010 at Utah State University. Arrington's collection of papers at Utah State's Merrill-Crazier Library adds up to 319 linear feet. It has been regarded as "one of the most important archival sources on twentieth-century Mormon history."

== BYU Speech ==
- "The Looseness of Zion: Joseph Smith and the Lighter View" – BYU Devotional, 1974

== Published works ==
The following is only a partial list of Arrington's published works. For a list that is complete up to 1979, see the "Bibliography of Leonard James Arrington" published by the academic journal Dialogue in 1978.

Books

- Arrington, Leonard J. (1958). Great Basin Kingdom: An Economic History of the Latter-day Saints, 1830–1900. Harvard University Press.
- —— (1966). Beet Sugar in the West: A History of the Utah-Idaho Sugar Company, 1891–1966. University of Washington Press.
- ——; Thomas G. Alexander (1974). Dean L. May (ed.). A Dependent Commonwealth: Utah's Economy from Statehood to the Great Depression. BYU Press.
- —— (1974). Charles C. Rich, Mormon General and Western Frontiersman. BYU Press.
- —— (1975). David Eccles: Pioneer Western Industrialist. Utah State University Press.
- ——; May, Dean; Fox, Feramorz Y. (1976). Building the City of God: Community & Cooperation Among the Mormons. Deseret Book.
- —— (1976). From Quaker to Latter-day Saint: Bishop Edwin D. Woolley. Deseret Book.
- ——; Bitton, Davis (1979). The Mormon Experience: A History of the Latter-day Saints. Alfred A. Knopf.
- ——; Bartholomew, Rebecca (1981). Rescue of the 1856 Handcart Companies. BYU Press.
- ——; Bitton, Davis (1981). Saints without Halos: The Human Side of Mormon History. Signature Books. Archived from the original on May 13, 2008.
- ——; Madsen, Susan Arrington (1984). Sunbonnet Sisters. Bookcraft. ISBN 9780884945208.
- —— (1985). Brigham Young: American Moses. Alfred A. Knopf.
- ——; Madsen, Susan Arrington (1987). Mothers of the Prophets. Deseret Book.
- ——; Bitton, Davis (1988). Mormons and Their Historians. University of Utah Press.
- —— (1994). History of Idaho (2 vols.). University of Idaho Press.
- —— (1998). Adventures of a Church Historian. University of Illinois Press.

Articles

- Arrington, Leonard J. (Autumn 1981). "The Writing of Latter-day Saints History: Problems, Accomplishments and Admonitions" (PDF). Dialogue: A Journal of Mormon Thought. 14 (3): 119–29. doi:10.2307/45225006. JSTOR 45225006. S2CID 254391380.
- Arrington, Leonard (1987). "Mormon Women in Nineteenth-Century Britain". BYU Studies Quarterly. 27 (1): 74–77.

=== Awards ===
- Great Basin Kingdom (1958)

Award of Merit (American Association for State and Local History)
Best First Book (Pacific Coast Branch of the American Historical Association)

- "The Search for Truth and Meaning in Mormon History" (1968), article in Dialogue: A Journal of Mormon Thought

Best Article Award (Mormon History Association)

- "Intolerable Zion: The Image of Mormonism in Nineteenth-Century American Literature" (1968), article in Western Humanities Review

Best Article Award (Mormon History Association)

- Building the City of God (1976)

Best Book Award (Mormon History Association)

- The Mormon Experience (1979)

Best Book Award (Mormon History Association)

- Brigham Young: American Moses (1985)

Best Book Award (Mormon History Association)
Evans Biography Award (Utah State University)
Nominated, National Book Critics Circle Award

- Adventures of a Church Historian (1998)

Special citation (Mormon History Association)

== See also ==
- Mormonism and history
