= Everton Genealogy Collection =

Coordinates: 41°44′11″N 111°50′08″W

== History ==
The Everton Genealogy Collection was started in 1947 by Walter Everton when he established the Everton Publishing Company. He and his successors in the company gathered items to be included in this collection. Some were donated, but most were added when they were sent to be reviewed in their magazine, The Genealogical Helper. Over the course of nearly sixty years, the collection gradually grew to include approximately 80,000 books, serials, pamphlets, compact discs, microfilms, atlases, maps, and databases. A large portion consisted of unpublished manuscripts that were rare or unique to the collection. The materials in the collection related to every state in the United States and the District of Columbia. While the focus was on the United States, there were resources for other nations as well.

In 2001, the publishing company was purchased by the Family History Network, Inc. and in 2004, then owner Bill Schjelderup, donated the collection to Logan City and the Logan Library. In October 2006 the collection opened to the public in the former Logan Justice building. In early 2008, the collection was closed to the public while city departments shuffled buildings.

In 2010, a condensed collection opened to the public within the Logan Library in the space formerly occupied by the Logan Municipal Council. It was no longer identified as the Everton Collection but continued to be a large portion of the items housed in the library's Virginia Hansen Special Collections Room.

When the new Logan Library building was being planned in about 2019-2020, it was decided that the Everton collection would no longer be housed at the library due to the fact that the collection had little local relevance and was not utilized enough to justify the space that it would need. When the library collections were moved out of the old building, nearly all of the Everton collection was donated to FamilySearch in Salt Lake City. The library did retain books that referenced Logan, Utah and the surrounding area.
