= G. Homer Durham =

American Mormon leader and academic administrator (1911–1985)

First Quorum of the Seventy
- April 2, 1977 – January 10, 1985

Presidency of the First Quorum of the Seventy
- October 1, 1981 – January 10, 1985

Personal details
- Born: George Homer Durham; February 4, 1911; Parowan, Utah, United States
- Died: January 10, 1985 (aged 73); Salt Lake City, Utah, United States
- Resting place: Salt Lake City Cemetery; 40.777°N 111.858°W

George Homer Durham (February 4, 1911 – January 10, 1985) was an American academic administrator and was a general authority of the Church of Jesus Christ of Latter-day Saints (LDS Church) from 1977 until his death.

== Early life ==
Durham was born in Parowan, Utah, and was raised in Salt Lake City. As a boy in grade school, he met and became lifelong friends with future LDS Church president Gordon B. Hinckley. As a young man, Durham served as a missionary for the LDS Church in the British Mission, where he served as president of the mission's Young Men's Mutual Improvement Association. At the start of his mission, Durham's mission president was John A. Widtsoe. On his mission, Durham met Widtsoe's daughter, Leah Eudora Widtsoe, whom he would later marry in the Salt Lake Temple. Durham's second mission president, Joseph F. Merrill, encouraged him to pursue graduate education when he returned to the United States.

=== Education and academia ===
Durham earned a B.A. in political science and history from the University of Utah.

Durham earned a Ph.D. in political science from the University of California, Los Angeles. He became a professor at the University of Utah. Durham would serve as the first head of the university's Political Science Department. He later served as the academic vice-president of the University of Utah. From 1960 to 1969, he was the president of Arizona State University. Under his presidency the university increased both in size and academic standing. From 1969 to 1976, he was the first commissioner and executive officer of the Utah System of Higher Education.

== General authority ==
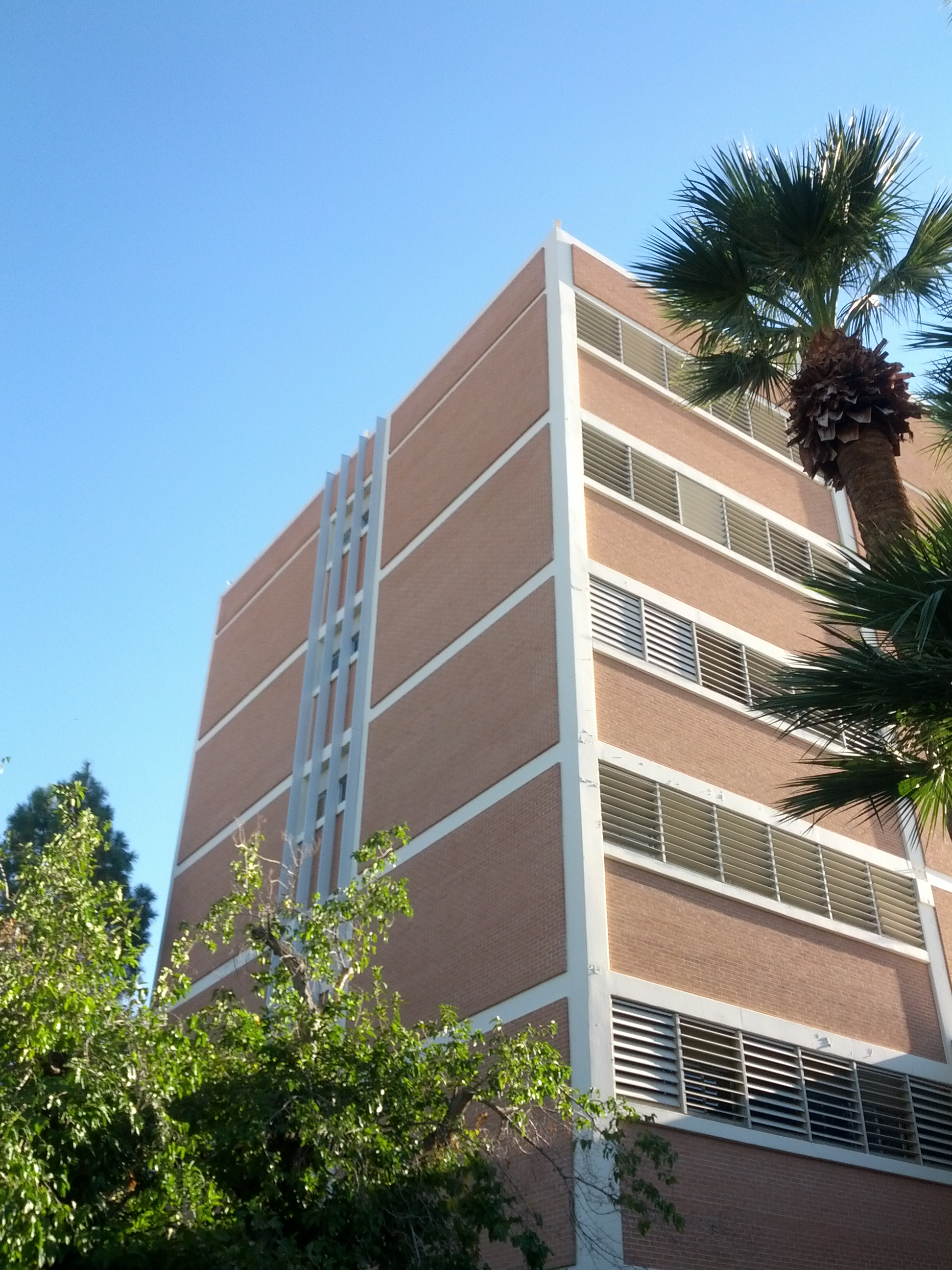
The Arizona State University Language and Literature Building was named for Durham in 1994

After he retired, Durham was appointed as a general authority of the LDS Church. He had previously served in the church as a stake president, as a member of the Sunday School general board, and as a regional representative. Durham became a member of the First Quorum of the Seventy in April 1977. Shortly afterward, he became managing director of the LDS Church Historical Department over Church Historian Leonard J. Arrington. In October 1981, Durham became a member of the Presidency of the Seventy and remained in that position until his death. From 1982 to his death, Durham was the church's seventeenth Church Historian and Recorder. He was succeeded in that assignment by Dean L. Larson.

Durham was a frequent contributor to the magazine Improvement Era and was the author or editor of a number of books, including compilations of the religious teachings of LDS church presidents John Taylor, Wilford Woodruff, Heber J. Grant, and David O. McKay.

Durham came from a musical family and he wrote the music to Gordon B. Hinckley's poem "My Redeemer Lives", which is now included as hymn number 135 in the LDS Church's current hymnal.

Durham and his wife were the parents of three children.

In 1994, Arizona State University renamed their Language & Literature Building the G. Homer Durham Languages & Literature Building.

Durham died in Salt Lake City. His personal and professional papers were donated to the University of Utah's J. Willard Marriott Library.

== Publications ==
- G. Homer Durham (1944). "Joseph Smith Prophet-Statesman" The Bookcraft Company
- —— (1944). A Political Interpretation of Mormon History (University of California Press)
- —— (1983). Arizona State University, 1960-1969: A Personal History
- —— (1958). Man as a Political Animal (Salt Lake City: University of Utah)
- —— (1982). N. Eldon Tanner, His Life and Service (Salt Lake City: Deseret Book)
- Heber J. Grant (G. Homer Durham ed.) (1941). Gospel Standards: Selections from the Sermons and Writings of Heber J. Grant (Salt Lake City: Improvement Era)
- David O. McKay (G. Homer Durham ed.) (1953). Gospel Ideals: Selections from the Discourses of David O. McKay (Salt Lake City: Improvement Era)
- John Taylor (G. Homer Durham ed.) (1943). The Gospel Kingdom: Selections from the Writings and Discourses of John Taylor, Third President of The Church of Jesus Christ of Latter-day Saints (Salt Lake City: Bookcraft) ISBN 1-57008-941-8
- John A. Widtsoe (G. Homer Durham ed.) (1960). Evidences and Reconciliations
- Wilford Woodruff (G. Homer Durham ed.) (1946). The Discourses of Wilford Woodruff, Fourth President of The Church of Jesus Christ of Latter-day Saints (Salt Lake City: Bookcraft)
