= V. Lewis Kofford =

V. Lewis Kofford (born 1939) is a former Mormon media executive who founded Covenant Communications and Seagull Book & Tape and was President and CEO when he sold them to Deseret Book in 2006.

Kofford started his business enterprises with Covenant Recording, Inc. in 1975. The business actually predated his entering it, but when he did it was a very small operation. This company specialized in production and distribution of tapes and records, primarily Mormon and other Christian music, but also dramatizations of Book of Mormon stories. By 1979 Covenant was providing materials to stores in 15 countries.

In 1984 this endeavor was reconstituted as Covenant Communications. In 1987 a direct distribution outlet was added, Seagull Book & Tape.
