= Seagull Book =

Former LDS bookstore chain

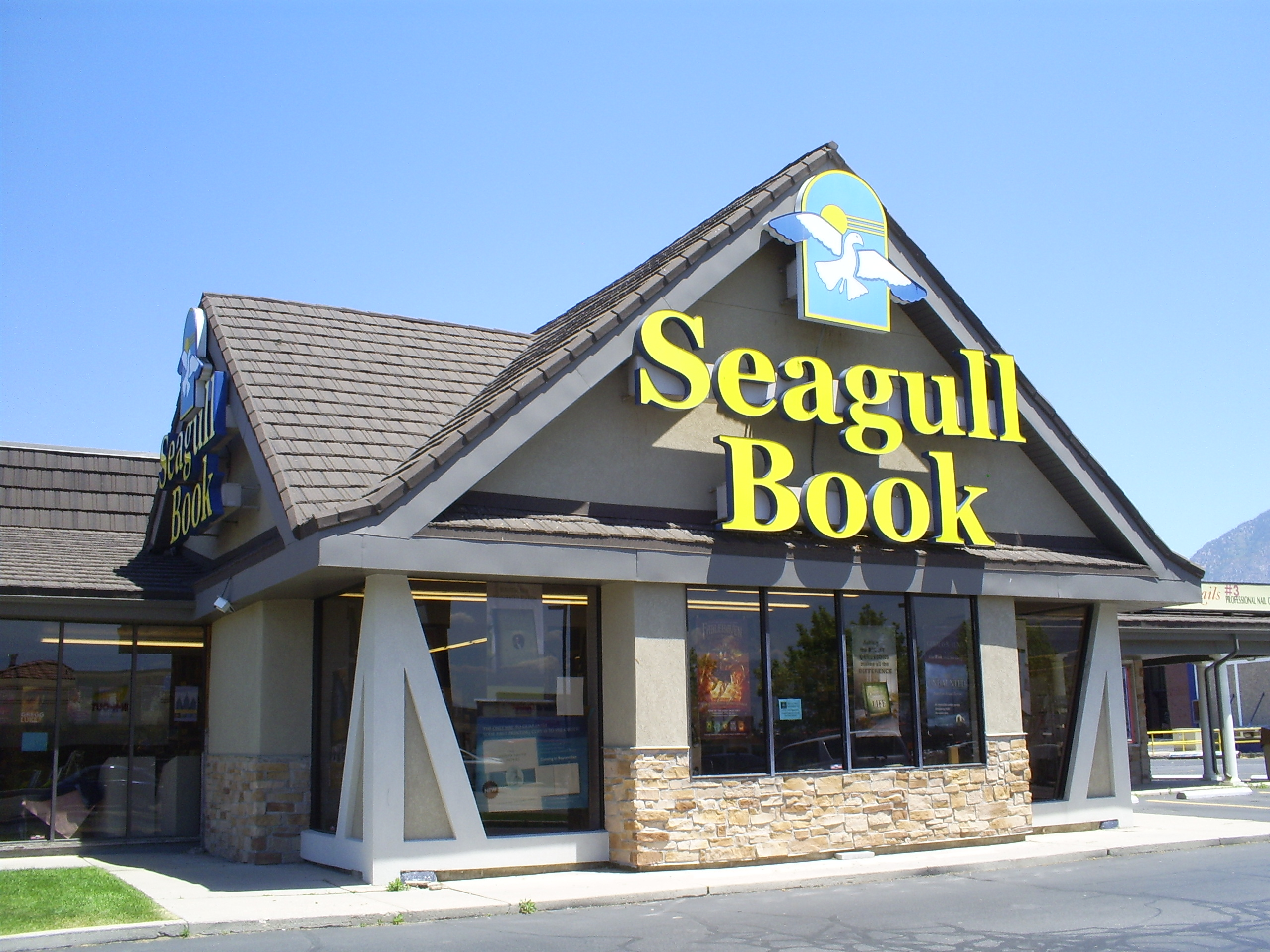
- Former Seagull Book store in Orem, Utah (2010)
- Company type: Private
- Industry: Chain bookstore
- Founded: American Fork, Utah, United States (1987)
- Founder: V. Lewis Kofford
- Defunct: December 2025
- Headquarters: Salt Lake City, Utah, United States
- Number of locations: 25 (November 2013)
- Area served: Utah, Idaho, Arizona, and Nevada (formerly in Dallas, Texas)
- Key people: Lewis Kofford (1987–2006); Greg Kofford (1990–92); Kim Kofford(1997-2002); Jon Kofford(2003-2006); Susan Condie (current)
- Products: Discount books, media, art, clothes and other products for Latter-day Saints
- Owner: Lewis Kofford (1987–2006)
- Number of employees: 200–300 (2006)
- Parent: Deseret Book Company (Deseret Management Corporation)

Seagull Book, initially called Seagull Book & Tape, was an American retail chain bookstore focusing on products for members of the Church of Jesus Christ of Latter-day Saints (LDS Church), and had two dozen stores in Utah, Idaho, Arizona, and Nevada. It was the second-largest LDS bookstore until its acquisition by market-leader Deseret Book in 2006, after which Seagull continued to operate as a discount chain distinct from Deseret Book branded retail stores.

In April 2025, Deseret Book announced it would close all Seagull Book stores by the end of the year, with all stores shuttered on December 24, 2025.

== History ==
=== Founding ===
Seagull Book & Tape was founded in 1987 by V. Lewis Kofford, the owner of LDS publisher Covenant Communications. He had previously organized Covenant in 1984, which absorbed Covenant Recordings, an LDS audio tape producer which Kofford had owned since 1977. He intended for Seagull to be a distribution channel for Covenant and other independent LDS publishers, and for it to fill a discount retail niche in the LDS market by keeping low overhead and purchasing in volume. Headquartered in American Fork, Utah, the bookstore was initially a division of Covenant Communications, and later its became its "sister company".

Seagull sold a variety of media types, including books, audio tapes, CDs, videos, and computer software. Some locations also bought and sold used and rare LDS books. The chain also sold traditional titles, such as self-improvement, fiction, children's books, cartoons and videos.

Before its acquisition of Seagull Book, Deseret Book was already the largest LDS retailer and the largest LDS publisher, and so from its founding Deseret Book products formed a significant portion of Seagull Book's offerings. LDS retailers, including Deseret Book, expanded rapidly in the 1990s, and the market had doubled since with the 1970s. Seagull grew aggressively in its first few years and kept comparable offerings to Deseret Book.

The company was a Kofford family business. From 1990 to 1992, Lewis brought in his son Greg Kofford, an MIT graduate and Wall Street investor, as Seagull's president and CEO. Afterward, Lewis Kofford himself served as president and CEO. Along with his daughter Kim Kofford served as Vice President, Merchandise and Marketing from 1997-2002. Then in the 2000s, Jon Kofford was vice president of Marketing and executive vice president.

=== Growth ===
Seagull Book's first store was a 6,000 square foot (560 m^{2}) retail space on Redwood Road in Salt Lake City. By 1990 it had grown to 8 locations. After expanding to 12 stores in 1991, including into California and Texas, revenue increased dramatically, leading to plans for further expansion. By 1992 the company had nearly $4 million in annual sales, 35 employees, and 15 locations.

During the 1990s Seagull had a cooperative advertising program with independent publisher Bookcraft, but when Deseret Book bought out Bookcraft in 1999 Seagull began to worry that Deseret Book would give preferential treatment to its own retail stores. In that same year Seagull launched SeagullBook.com as an online bookstore.

During the 2000s Seagull continued "chipping away" at Deseret Book as its main competitor. By 2006, it operated 26 stores with between 200 and 300 employees.

=== Deseret Book conflict ===
In July 2006, Deseret Book publicly disputed how its products were promoted at Seagull bookstores. Deseret Book claimed Seagull wasn't properly honoring its merchandising programs or adequately utilizing promotional materials, which it requires of all its vendors. Deseret Book announced that its wholesale division would no longer sell to Seagull Book and it was not seeking negotiation before the decision would take effect at the end of the month.

This announcement was "a complete surprise to Seagull management" who saw this as "a deliberate attack on its presence in the LDS market" and assumed "discount prices are the reason." Some worried this could crush Seagull's business, which was understood to rely on sales from Deseret Book products.

In an attempt to negotiate their situation, Seagull Book consulted with a public relations company and scheduled a press conference. Within hours the conference was canceled when Deseret Book lifted their ban for one month to allow for talks with Seagull. As the companies explored the possibility of Deseret Book acquiring Seagull, the deadline was extended beyond August.

=== Acquisition ===
In December 2006, Deseret Book bought Seagull Book, as well as its sister company Covenant Communications, another major Deseret Book competitor. Financial details were not publicly disclosed.

At the age of 67, Lewis Kofford was considering retirement and initiated the buyout discussions. In recent years Deseret Book had acquired other major competitors, including Bookcraft, Excel Entertainment Group, and LDS Living magazine.

This created a chain of 69 stores, although they would continue as two independent, coexisting companies, and retain their existing stores, employees, and market specialties. The retailers were already successfully filling two different niches in the LDS market, and rather than transform into Deseret Book, Seagull would act as its discount chain. Seagull Book continued to operate as an independent entity to Deseret Book retail stores, until its shutdown in December 2025.

Following the merger, independent publisher Kent Larsen published his concerns, saying that when Deseret Book has previously acquired its largest competitors (such as Bookcraft in 1999), the LDS market shrank resulting in fewer publications and leading to downsizing.

== Company name ==
Seagull Book & Tape logo (until 2006)

The "Tape" in Seagull Book & Tape referred to the store's marketing of audio cassette tapes, generally of recorded sermons and lectures of popular LDS speakers. Many of these products were produced by Covenant Recordings, or Covenant Communications, for which owner Lewis Kofford also founded Seagull as a retail outlet. When Seagull was sold to Deseret Book in 2006, the store's name was shortened to "Seagull Book". By this time audio tape products had been largely replaced by compact discs (CDs).

The seagull is a symbol in Mormon culture from the miracle of the gulls, a Mormon legend about gulls saving early Mormon pioneers from a plague of crickets. The California gull is the Utah state bird and appears in the LDS Church's Seagull Monument in Salt Lake City.
