= Logan Library =

Coordinates: 41°44′11″N 111°50′08″W

- Location: Logan, Utah, United States
- Type: Public
- Established: 1916
- Branches: 0

Collection
- Size: 115,794 (FY 2025)

Access and use
- Circulation: 661,738 (FY 2025)
- Population served: 56,770 (2025)

Other information
- Budget: $3,044,331 (FY 2025)
- Director: Michael Sauers
- Employees: 28
- Website: library.loganutah.gov

Logan Library is a public library in Logan, Utah. It serves the 56,000 citizens of Logan with a collection of about 120,000 informational and recreational items, more than 300 events each year for people of all ages, nine public meeting rooms, free wireless Internet access, public internet computers, printing services, and a makerspace.

== Collection ==
The Logan Library maintains collections of popular materials in fiction, nonfiction, children's, young adult, large print, magazines, Spanish, graphic novels, and audiovisual materials (DVDs, CDs, etc.) of many formats.

In addition to the popular collections, the library maintains its Special Collections, composed of local history items, the remnant of the Everton Genealogy Collection, and a collection of local fine art.

== Programs & Activities ==
The library provides more than 500 free programs throughout the year which are popular with community members of all ages. These include summer reading programs with prizes and activities, regular story times, afterschool programs, film showings every Monday evening, monthly family game nights, informational classes, an annual community fair featuring local nonprofit organizations, an annual writers conference, an art wall featuring local visual artists, and Helicon West, a longstanding literary open mic event with featured readers.

== Management Structure ==
Under Utah state statute, Logan Library is governed by a board of trustees consisting of a city council representative and six members drawn from the community and approved by the mayor. The board meets on a monthly basis. The day-to-day operations of the library are managed by the board-chosen Director, an Assistant Director, and a staff of five librarians, three associate librarians, six Library Technical Assistants, nine Library Customer Assistants, and three pages.

== Funding ==
The Logan Library is funded by a dedicated property tax and therefore prospective card holders must prove Logan residency, or business or property ownership, before circulation privileges are granted. Anyone living outside Logan may purchase a library card for an annual fee of $163.00 per household.

== History ==
Logan Library traces its history to the library that was formally established by Logan City on April 18, 1916. The library's collection consisted of the donated libraries of St. John's Episcopal Church (1,200+ titles) and the Cache Stake LDS Mutual Improvement Association in Logan. In October 1920, the library came under the direction of Cache County, in accordance with Utah House Bill 97. County and city each agreed to pay half the operating costs. The new Cache County Library was housed in a rental property, later nicknamed "The Dungeon." A new library building was erected at 90 North 100 East in Logan in 1932. This building still stands.

For the next 25 years, Cache County Library grew and expanded. Local businesses and individual members of the community donated cash, books, and furniture. The library had a large and popular genealogy collection, a space used as headquarters for the local Boy Scouts, and hosted art shows and concerts. The building and its contents became a source of pride for Cache County citizens. Unfortunately, after a few years, problems with the structure itself were evident: the roof leaked, there were issues with the boiler, and the lighting was considered inadequate. Most of these problems were handled in temporary fashion until funds could be procured for more permanent solutions.

In the 1960s, the library board met infrequently, calls for expanded service to County citizens in the form of a bookmobile were rejected, arguments erupted among the many groups using the library building (including the ever more powerful genealogy librarian), the need for building improvements was recognized but little action was taken, individual monetary gifts to the library began to decrease, and (for several years) the library recorded budget deficits. The library's director for much of this time (1940s to the 1970s) was Miss Virginia Hansen.

In the 1970s, Cache County leaders indicated that they were interested in divesting themselves of the library and, in 1976, after many contentious debates about the future (including the discussion of a possible county-wide library system), Cache County sold its half of the library back to Logan City, recreating the Logan Library.

In 1981, Mr. Ronald Jenkins was hired as director and, five years later, the Logan Library moved into the south half of the former Palace d’Or dancehall and later Sears store at 255 North Main in a dual-use arrangement with the city offices. During his directorship, the library expanded greatly in the quality and quantity of both its collection and services.

In 2009, the Library was given the use of its entire building when the city offices moved into a new building.

In 2011, Jenkins retired after 30 years as the library's director, having become the longest-serving library director in Utah. Robert Shupe, former Director of the Mohave County Library District, was hired as the new Director.

In December 2012, the library reached a milestone event, having checked out over 1 million items during the previous year.

In 2017, Karen Clark, a 20-year employee of the library, was hired as Director.

On February 14, 2022, the demolition of the library building at 255 North Main Street began to make way for a new building at the same location. The library materials were available in a limited capacity at the Logan City Service Center at 950 West 600 North.

Construction of the new library was completed, and the new building opened in March 2024.

In March 2025, Michael Sauers was hired as Director.
