= Washington County Historical Society =

Washington County Historical Society may refer to:

- Washington County Historical Association, an organization based in Fort Calhoun, Nebraska, United States
- Washington County Historical Society, an organization in Florida, United States
- Washington County Historical Society, an organization in Ohio, United States
- Washington County Historical Society, an organization in Minnesota, United States
- Washington County Historical Society (Utah), an organization based in St. George, Utah, United States
- Washington County Historical Society, an organization in Wisconsin United States
- Washington County Historical Society in Fayetteville, Arkansas

== See also ==
- List of historical societies
