= Mark E. Petersen =

American religious leader (1900–1984)

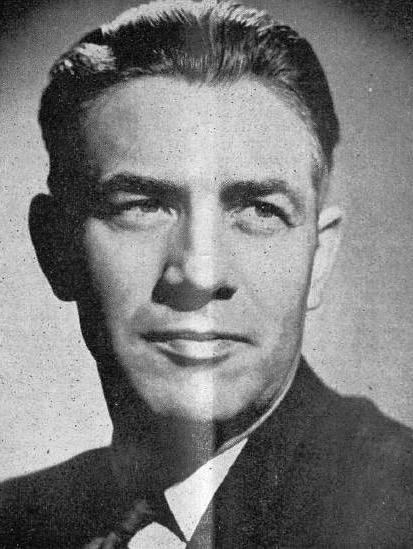

Quorum of the Twelve Apostles
- April 20, 1944 – January 11, 1984

LDS Church Apostle
- April 20, 1944 – January 11, 1984
- Reason: Excommunication of Richard R. Lyman
- Reorganization at end of term: Russell M. Nelson and Dallin H. Oaks were ordained after the deaths of Petersen and LeGrand Richards

Personal details
- Born: Mark Edward Petersen; November 7, 1900; Salt Lake City, Utah, U.S.
- Died: January 11, 1984 (aged 83); Murray, Utah, U.S.
- Resting place: Salt Lake City Cemetery; 40°46′37.92″N 111°51′28.8″W
- Spouse(s): Emma Marr McDonald
- Children: 2 daughters

Mark Edward Petersen (November 7, 1900 – January 11, 1984) was an American news editor and religious leader. He was born in Salt Lake City, Utah. He served as a member of the Quorum of the Twelve Apostles of the Church of Jesus Christ of Latter-day Saints (LDS Church) from 1944 until his death. He became managing editor of the church-owned Deseret News in 1935 and then editor in 1941. He filled the vacancy in the Quorum caused by the excommunication of Richard R. Lyman.

== Early life ==
As a young boy, Petersen was a newspaper carrier, and he also helped in his father’s construction business. Later, he attended the University of Utah and served a mission for the LDS Church in Nova Scotia. In pursuing a career, he became a reporter for the Deseret News and continued working for the paper for 60 years, advancing to the position of president and chairman of the board. Petersen wrote numerous editorials and published more than 40 books and many pamphlets used in the church's missionary effort. His wife was Emma Marr McDonald Petersen (1893–1975).

== LDS Church service ==
In April 1944, while serving as general manager of the Deseret News, Petersen was called to be a member of the Quorum of the Twelve Apostles. In his calling as an apostle, he directed the church’s public information programs and served on the Military Relations Committee. He was an adviser to the church's Relief Society, Indian Affairs Committee, and Music Committee. He served as president of the West European Mission for more than six years. Petersen was also involved in many community affairs. He was closely associated with the Boy Scouts of America and was a recipient of the Silver Antelope Award. In 1959, in response to a rash of arrests of gay men in Utah and Idaho, church president David O. McKay assigned apostles Spencer W. Kimball and Petersen to work on curing gays within the church.

=== Controversial teachings ===
At Brigham Young University on 27 August 1954, at the Convention of Teachers of Religion on the College Level, Petersen delivered the speech, "Race Problems—As They Affect the Church." The speech outlined the religious underpinnings of racial segregation and supported its continued practice as it related to intermarriage between blacks and whites. Particularly, he reaffirmed the LDS Church's teaching at that time that those with dark skin had been less valiant in their lives before coming to earth. He also reiterated the idea that blacks were to be servants to righteous white people after the resurrection. Petersen said:

In spite of all he did in the pre-existent life, the Lord is willing, if the Negro accepts the gospel with real, sincere faith, and is really converted, to give him the blessings of baptism and the gift of the Holy Ghost. If that Negro is faithful all his days, he can and will enter the celestial kingdom. He will go there as a servant, but he will get a celestial resurrection. He will get a place in the celestial glory.

In the 1940s, Petersen coined the term "Mormon fundamentalist" to describe people who had left the LDS Church to practice plural marriage.

== Death ==
Petersen died from longstanding complications of cancer after entering Cottonwood Hospital in Murray, Utah, and undergoing surgery. He was buried at Salt Lake City Cemetery.

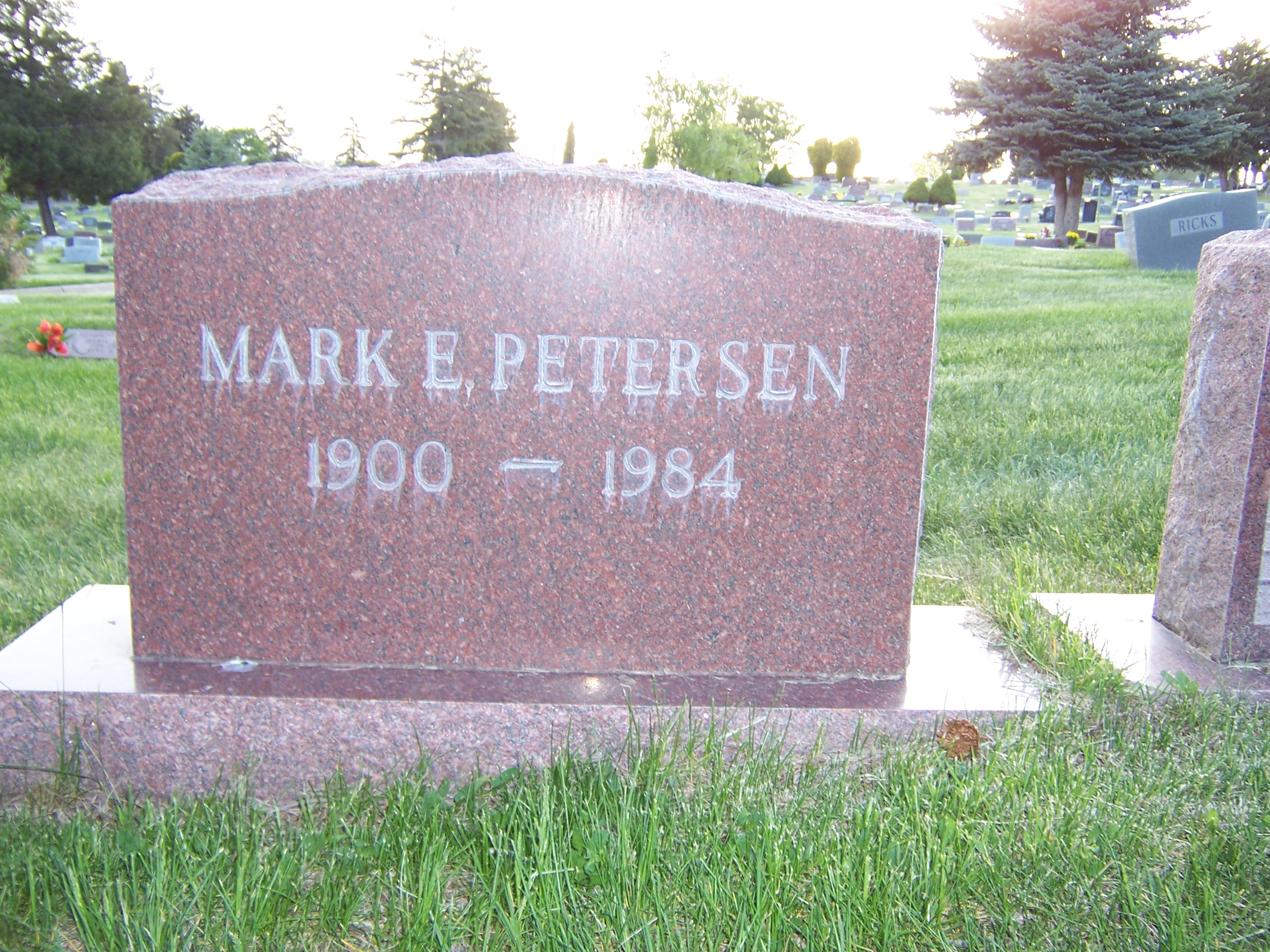
Grave marker of Mark E. Petersen

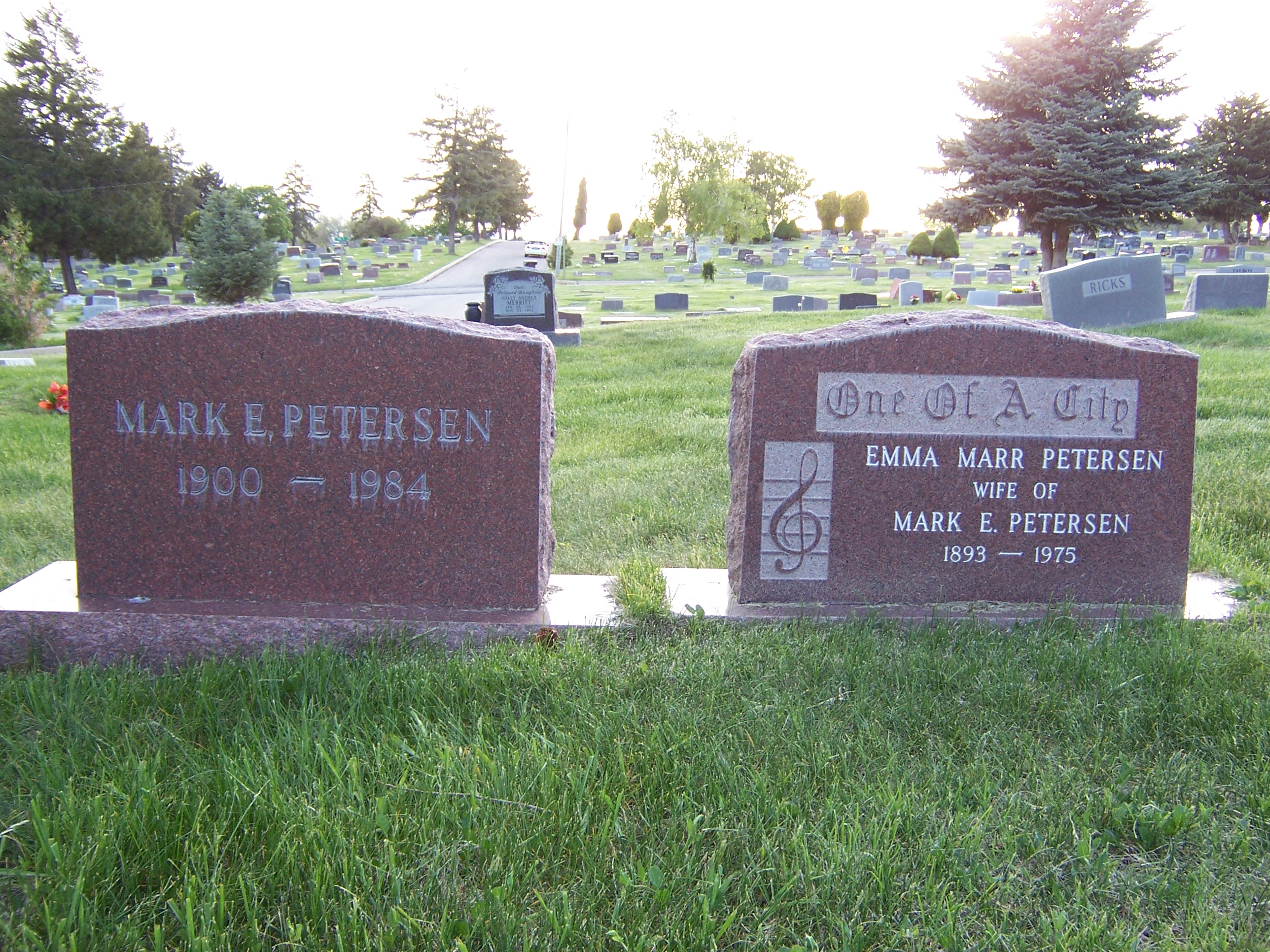
Grave markers of Mark E. Petersen and Emma Marr Petersen

== Publications ==
- —— (1953). Your Faith and You. Salt Lake City, Utah: Bookcraft.
- —— (1953). An apostle speaks to youth about... The Sacredness of Sex - Chastity in Its Holy Mission. Provo, Utah: Brigham Young University.
- —— (1954). For Time or Eternity. Salt Lake City, Utah: Bookcraft.
- —— (1959). A Faith to Live By. Salt Lake City, Utah: Bookcraft.
- —— (1959). Teen Dating and Marriage. Salt Lake City, Utah: Deseret Book
- —— (1960). Toward a Better Life. Salt Lake City, Utah: Deseret Book.
- —— (1962). Patterns for Living. Salt Lake City, Utah: Bookcraft.
- —— (1962). One Lord ... One Faith!. Salt Lake City, Utah: Deseret Book.
- —— (1963). Faith Works!. Salt Lake City, Utah: Bookcraft.
- —— (1964). Guide to a Happy Marriage. Englewood Cliffs, N.J.: Prentice-Hall.
- —— (1965). Our Moral Challenge. Salt Lake City, Utah: Deseret Book.
- —— (1966). Why the Religious Life. Salt Lake City, Utah: Deseret Book.
- —— (1966). As Translated Correctly. Salt Lake City, Utah: Deseret Book.
- —— (1969). The Way to Peace. Salt Lake City, Utah: Bookcraft.
- —— (1969). Drugs, Drinks & Morals. Salt Lake City, Utah: Deseret Book. LCCN 79-109605. OCLC 123940.
- —— (1971). Live it Up!. Salt Lake City, Utah: Deseret Book. ISBN 0-87747-450-8.
- —— (1972). Marriage and Common Sense. Salt Lake City, Utah: Bookcraft.
- —— Petersen, Emma Marr (1973). Virtue Makes Sense!. Salt Lake City, Utah: Deseret Book. ISBN 0-87747-500-8.
- —— (1974). The Way of the Master. Salt Lake City, Utah: Bookcraft. ISBN 0-88494-271-6.
- —— (1975). The Great Prologue. Salt Lake City, Utah: Deseret Book. ISBN 0-87747-557-1.
- —— (1976). Adam, Who is He?. Salt Lake City, Utah: Deseret Book. ISBN 0-87747-592-X.
- —— (1976). The Salt and the Savor. Salt Lake City, Utah: Bookcraft. ISBN 0-88494-306-2.
- —— (1977). Moses: Man of Miracles. Salt Lake City, Utah: Deseret Book. ISBN 0-87747-651-9.
- —— (1977). Marriage: Covenants and Conflicts. Salt Lake City, Utah: Bookcraft.
- —— (1978). Joshua, Man of Faith. Salt Lake City, Utah: Deseret Book. ISBN 0-87747-720-5.
- —— (1978). The Unknown God. Salt Lake City, Utah: Bookcraft. ISBN 0-88494-337-2.
- —— (1979). Those Gold Plates!. Salt Lake City, Utah: Bookcraft. ISBN 0-88494-364-X.
- —— (1979). Abraham, Friend of God. Salt Lake City, Utah: Deseret Book. ISBN 0-87747-780-9.
- —— (1979). The Forerunners. Salt Lake City, Utah: Bookcraft. ISBN 0-88494-376-3.
- —— (1980). Three Kings of Israel. Salt Lake City, Utah: Bookcraft. ISBN 0-87747-829-5.
- —— (1981). Isaiah for Today. Salt Lake City, Utah: Deseret Book. ISBN 0-87747-882-1.
- —— (1981). Children of Promise: The Lamanites: Yesterday & Today. Salt Lake City, Utah: Bookcraft. ISBN 0-88494-431-X.
- —— (1981). Family Power!. Salt Lake City, Utah: Bookcraft.
- —— (1981). Joseph of Egypt. Salt Lake City, Utah: Deseret Book. ISBN 0-87747-861-9.
- —— (1982). Noah and the Flood. Salt Lake City, Utah: Deseret Book. ISBN 0-87747-935-6.
- —— (1982). This Is Life Eternal. Salt Lake City, Utah: Bookcraft. ISBN 0-88494-474-3.
- —— (1983). Malachi and the Great and Dreadful Day. Salt Lake City, Utah: Deseret Book. ISBN 0-87747-962-3.
- —— (1983). Alma and Abinadi. Salt Lake City, Utah: Deseret Book. ISBN 0-87747-959-3.
- —— (1984). The Jaredites. Salt Lake City, Utah: Deseret Book. ISBN 0-87747-998-4.
- —— (1984). The Teachings of Paul. Salt Lake City, Utah: Deseret Book. ISBN 0-87747-843-0.
- —— (1984). The Sons of Mosiah. Salt Lake City, Utah: Deseret Book. ISBN 0-87747-297-1.

The Church of Jesus Christ of Latter-day Saints titles
Preceded by Ezra Taft Benson	Quorum of the Twelve Apostles; April 20, 1944 – January 11, 1984	Succeeded by Matthew Cowley
