= Joseph Fielding McConkie =

American ancient scripture professor

Joseph Fielding McConkie (3 April 1941–10 October 2013) was a professor of Ancient Scripture at Brigham Young University (BYU) and an author or co-author of over 25 books.

McConkie was a member of the Church of Jesus Christ of Latter-day Saints (LDS Church) and the son of Bruce R. McConkie and Amelia Smith McConkie (daughter of Joseph Fielding Smith). In 1966, he married Brenda Kempton in the Salt Lake Temple.

McConkie was born in Salt Lake City, Utah and graduated from Olympus High School in 1959, received a Doctorate of Education from BYU in 1973 and was an LDS Chaplain in Vietnam. He served in many capacities in the LDS Church, including as president of the Scotland Edinburgh Mission from 1989 to 1992. He also served as president of a student stake at BYU and was an Institute Director in Seattle, Washington.

Before retiring, McConkie taught at BYU as a Professor of Ancient Scripture in the College of Religious Education.

== Works ==
Many of McConkie's books primarily address Joseph of Egypt, Joseph Smith, the Book of Mormon, and the revelations of The Restoration. He said his book Between the Lines is an attempt to correct some misreadings of scripture.

Books

- The Church of Jesus Christ of Latter-day Saints and the Reorganized Church of Jesus Christ of Latter Day Saints on Four Distinctive Aspects of Deity as Taught by Joseph Smith. Brigham Young University Master Thesis (1968)
- True and Faithful, The Life Story of Joseph Fielding Smith. Bookcraft (1971)
- Teach and Reach. Bookcraft (1975)
- Journal of Discourses Digest, Volume 1. Bookcraft (1975)
- Seeking the Spirit. Deseret Book (1978)
- En Busca Del Don Celestial—In Search of the Spirit (Spanish). Deseret Book (2006)
- His Name Shall Be Joseph, "Ancient Prophecies of the Latter-day Seer". Hawkes Publishing, Inc. (1980)
- The Spirit of Revelation. Deseret Book (1984)
- Hearken, O Ye People, Discourses on the Doctrine and Covenants, Sperry Symposium 1984. editor. Randall Book (1984)
- Sustaining and Defending the Faith. co-authored with Robert L. Millet. Deseret Book (1985)
- Gospel Symbolism. Deseret Book (1985)
- The Life Beyond. co-authored with Robert L. Millet. Deseret Book (1986)
- Doctrinal Commentary on the Book of Mormon, Volume 1 - First and Second Nephi. co-authored with Robert L. Millet. Bookcraft (1987)
- Doctrinal Commentary on the Book of Mormon, Volume 2 - Jacob through Mosiah. co-authored with Robert L. Millet. Bookcraft (1988)
- Prophets and Prophecy. Bookcraft (1988)
- In His Holy Name. co-authored with Robert L. Millet. Bookcraft (1988)
- Truth and Courage: Joseph F. Smith Letters, editor. privately published by 1988 Joseph F. Smith Family Trustees and Officers (1988)
- The Holy Ghost. co-authored with Robert L. Millet. Bookcraft (1989)
- The Man Adam. co-edited with Robert L. Millet. Bookcraft (1990)
- A Guide to Scriptural Symbols. co-authored with Donald W. Parry. Bookcraft (1990)
- Doctrinal Commentary on the Book of Mormon, Volume 3 - Alma through Helaman. co-authored with Robert L. Millet. Bookcraft (1991)
- Doctrinal Commentary on the Book of Mormon, Volume 4 - Third Nephi through Mormon. co-authored with Robert L. Millet and Brent L. Top. Bookcraft (1992)
- Our Destiny The Call and Election of the House of Israel. co-authored with Robert L. Millet. Deseret Book (1993)
- Sons and Daughters of God: The Loss and Restoration of Our Divine Inheritance. Bookcraft (1994)
- Here We Stand. Deseret Book (1995)
- Joseph Smith, The Choice Seer: The Prophet's Greatness as Teacher, Priesthood Leader, and Restorer. co-authored by Robert L. Millet. Bookcraft (1996)
- Answers: Straightforward Answers to Tough Gospel Questions. Deseret Book (1998) ISBN 978-1573453554
- Witnesses of the Birth of Christ. Bookcraft (1998) ISBN 978-1570085789
- Revelations of the Restoration: A Commentary on the Doctrine & Covenants & Other Modern Revelations. co-authored with Craig J. Ostler. Deseret Book (2000) ISBN 978-1573457859
- The Bruce R. McConkie Story: Reflections of a Son. Deseret Book (2003) ISBN 978-1590382059
- Understanding the Power God Gives Us. Deseret Book (2004) ISBN 978-1590382332
- The Smith Family: A Tradition of Revelation. Self-published (Christmas 2005)
- Between the Lines: Unlocking Scripture with Timeless Principles. Digital Legend (2009) ISBN 978-1934537527
- Valiant in the Testimony of Christ. Digital Legend (2009) ISBN 978-1934537534
- Christ, Covenants, & Salvation. Ben Haven Books (2010) ISBN 978-0615466071
- 50 Truths the devil doesn't want you to know. Ben Haven Books (2013) ISBN 978-0989579209
- Defending the Sanctity of Marriage. Ben Haven Books (2014) ISBN 978-0989579216

Columns

McConkie contributed columns to Meridian Magazine and LDS Living:

- Mary and Elisabeth: Handmaidens of the Lord
- What Was It Like to Have Bruce R. McConkie as Your Father?
- Political and Religious Freedom: Understanding the Power God Gives Us
- Questions Commonly Asked By Those Not of Our Faith
- From Father to Son: Joseph F. McConkie on Gospel Teaching
- Joseph Smith and the One True Church Doctrine

Talks

Some of McConkie's talks and lessons:

- Finding Answers, BYU Devotional, 12 December 2006: video, audio, transcript
- The How of Scripture Study, BYU Education Week, 23 August 2006: video, audio
- The Smith Family and a Tradition of Revelation, Sperry Symposium, 28 October 2005: audio
- The Prophet Joseph Smith: Revealer of Truth, BYU Education Week, 15 August 2005: video, audio
- Joseph Smith as Known to Isaiah, BYU-I Devotional, 12 October 2004: audio
- Agency, Ricks College Devotional, 9 November 1999: audio
- The Prophet Joseph Smith: Evidences of His Testimony, BYU Education Week, 16 August 1999: audio
- President Joseph F. Smith's Panoramic Vision: Doctrine & Covenants 138, BYU Education Week, 18 August 1997: audio
- Recently interviewed on the topic of LDS scriptural interpretation and doctrine, on the LDS sponsored podcast "Mormon Identities," by Eric D. Huntsman (part 1 and part 2 .)
