= Oscar W. McConkie Jr. =

American politician and attorney (1926–2020)

Oscar W. McConkie Jr

President of the Utah State Senate
- In office 1965–1966

Member of the Utah State Senate
- In office 1965–1967

Member of the Utah House of Representatives
- In office 1955–1957

Personal details
- Born: Oscar Walter McConkie Jr; May 26, 1926 Monticello, Utah, U.S.
- Died: November 2, 2020 (aged 94) Salt Lake City, Utah, U.S.
- Party: Democratic
- Relations: Oscar W. McConkie (father); Bruce R. McConkie (brother)
- Children: 8
- Education: University of Utah (BA, JD)

Military service
- Branch/service: United States Navy
- Battles/wars: World War II

Oscar Walter McConkie Jr. (May 26, 1926 – November 2, 2020) was an American politician and attorney in Utah and leader in the Church of Jesus Christ of Latter-day Saints (LDS Church). He was the president of the Utah State Senate from 1965 to 1966, subsequently becoming the chairman of the law firm of Kirton McConkie. McConkie authored several popular books on Latter-day Saint subjects.

== Early life and education ==
McConkie was born in Monticello, Utah, to Oscar W. McConkie and Margaret Vivian Redd. He grew up primarily in Salt Lake City, but, as a toddler he lived in Ann Arbor, where his father was pursuing a law degree at the University of Michigan. Oscar, Sr., was a State District Court judge for many years and was the Democratic candidate for governor of Utah in 1960. Oscar, Jr.'s older brother, Bruce R. McConkie, became a prominent general authority and author in the LDS Church. McConkie served in the United States Navy during World War II.

Oscar Jr. studied at the University of New Mexico from 1944 to 1946, where he also played football. He then went to the University of Utah, where he received a bachelor's degree in 1949 in political science and a Juris Doctor in 1952.

McConkie served in various LDS Church callings, including as bishop, stake president, mission president in Arizona, regional representative, and patriarch.

== Career ==
From 1952 to 1967, McConkie was an instructor in business law at Stevens–Henager College. He was the county attorney for Summit County, Utah from 1959 to 1963. Like his father, McConkie became a prominent Utah Democrat, and in 1960, he was the Utah point man for the John F. Kennedy 1960 presidential campaign.

From 1955 to 1957, McConkie was a member of the Utah House of Representatives. McConkie was elected president of the Utah State Senate during his first term in office. It was the first time a state senator in his initial term was elected president of the senate since the beginning term of the Utah State Senate. In 1956, he ran against William A. Dawson for Utah's 2nd congressional district. He also served very briefly in 1965 and in 1966 as acting governor when both the governor and secretary of state of Utah were not in the state.

McConkie was president of the Salt Lake City School Board and from 1982 to 1984 he was chair of the Utah State Board of Education. He was chair of the Governor's Committee on Education from 1983 to 1985.

McConkie was a senior law partner representing the LDS Church. McConkie argued the case that led to a broadening of the clergy-penitent privilege in Utah to include any information that was given by a parishioner to a cleric with the intent of getting spiritual advice. McConkie has been involved in international law, having drafted laws that were enacted in both Jamaica and Mauritius.

McConkie was a key figure in the process of getting official recognition of the LDS Church in Zaire in 1986.

McConkie was named lawyer of the year by the Utah State Bar in 2007.

== Personal life ==
McConkie married Judith Stoddard in the Salt Lake Temple in 1951. They had eight children.

He died from complications of COVID-19 in Salt Lake City, on November 2, 2020, at the age of 94, during the COVID-19 pandemic in Utah.

== Publications ==
- McConkie, Oscar W. Jr. (1962). The Kingdom of God: A Study Course for Priests Under 21 and Bearers of the Aaronic Priesthood Over 21 Years Old in The Church of Jesus Christ of Latter-day Saints for 1963. [Prepared under the direction of the Presiding Bishopric]. Salt Lake City, Utah: Church of Jesus Christ of Latter-day Saints.
- —— (1963). God and Man: A Study Course for Priests Under 21 and Bearers of the Aaronic Priesthood Over 21 years Old in the Church of Jesus Christ of Latter-day Saints for 1964. Salt Lake City, Utah: Presiding Bishopric of the Church of Jesus Christ of Latter-day Saints.
- —— (1964). The Priest in the Aaronic Priesthood: A Study Course for the Priests and Aaronic Priesthood-Adults in the Church of Jesus Christ of Latter-day Saints for 1965. Salt Lake City, Utah: Presiding Bishopric of the Church of Jesus Christ of Latter-day Saints.
- —— (1975). Angels. Salt Lake City, Utah: Deseret Book. ISBN 0-87747-572-5.
- —— (1977). Aaronic Priesthood. Salt Lake City, Utah: Deseret Book. ISBN 0-87747-631-4.
- —— (1979). She Shall Be Called Woman. Salt Lake City, Utah: Bookcraft. ISBN 0-88494-380-1.
- —— (1989). "Why the Pearl of Great Price". In H. Donl Peterson; Charles D. Tate Jr. (eds.). The Pearl of Great Price: Revelations from God. Provo, Utah: Religious Studies Center, Brigham Young University. pp. 1–12. ISBN 0-8849-4683-5.
- —— (1992). "Angels". In Daniel H. Ludlow (ed.). Encyclopedia of Mormonism. New York: Macmillan. pp. 40–42. ISBN 0-87579-924-8.
- —— (2007). "Living Up to Our Patriarchies". In Kent P. Jackson; Andrew C. Skinner (eds.). Witness for the Restoration: Essays in Honor of Robert J. Matthews. Provo, Utah: Religious Studies Center, Brigham Young University. pp. 281–305. ISBN 978-0-8425-2676-0.
