= Oscar W. McConkie =

American politician (1887–1966)

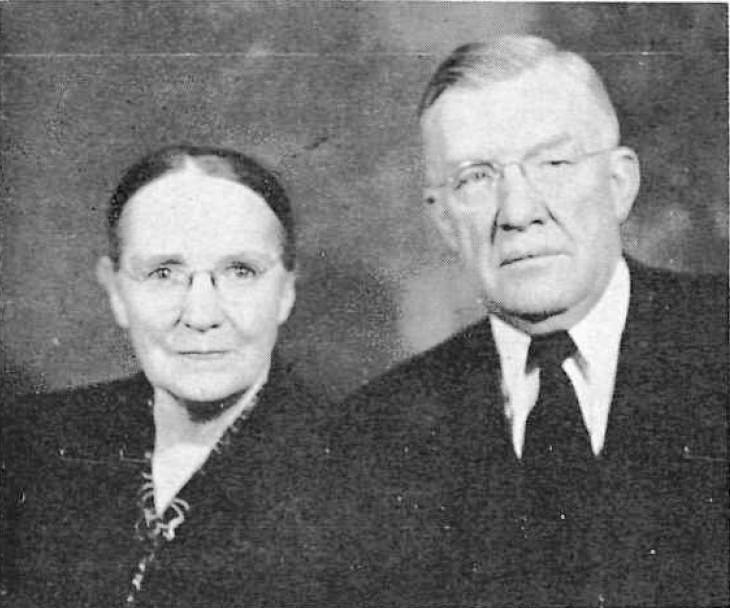
- Vivian and Oscar McConkie, c. 1952
- Born: May 9, 1887; Buena Vista, Utah, U.S.
- Died: April 9, 1966 (aged 78)
- Education: University of Michigan
- Occupations: Salt Lake City commissioner, Utah State Senator, leader in the LDS Church

Oscar Walter McConkie (May 9, 1887 – April 9, 1966) was a Utah State Senator and leader in the Church of Jesus Christ of Latter-day Saints (LDS Church). He was the father of Bruce R. McConkie, a member of the Quorum of the Twelve Apostles of the LDS Church. A second son, Oscar W. McConkie, Jr., was a member of the Utah State Senate.

== Early years ==
McConkie was born in Buena Vista, Utah, a small town close to Moab, Utah. At the time, his father was sought by government officials for recognizing his three wives. As such, so not long after his birth, Oscar moved to Mexico. His father died in Pacheco, Galeana, Chihuahua in December 1890.

After his father's death, the family moved to Mona, Utah, where McConkie was raised. The McConkies moved to Moab when Oscar was ten years old. After graduating from Moab High School, McConkie attended the University of Utah. In 1913, he married Margaret Vivian Redd in the Salt Lake Temple. In 1914, McConkie began his law studies at the University of Michigan, which led to his son, Bruce, being born in Ann Arbor.

== Early career ==
After two years at law school, McConkie was having eye troubles and so returned to Utah. He worked as editor of the San Juan Record, based from Monticello, Utah, where he also practiced law until 1922. In 1925, McConkie returned to Ann Arbor to finish his law studies at the University of Michigan after which he moved to Salt Lake City in the fall of 1926.

== Judicial positions ==
McConkie served as a judge in San Juan County, Utah, from 1919 to 1922, and Utah's Third District Court Judge, from 1928 to 1940. He also served as Salt Lake City commissioner.

In 1940, McConkie unsuccessfully sought to be the Democratic candidate for Governor of Utah.

== LDS Church service ==
Throughout his life, McConkie served in callings and leadership positions in the LDS Church. From 1920 to 1923, he was bishop of the Monticello Ward, before becoming a counselor in the presidency of the church's San Juan Stake to Wayne H. Redd, his wife's uncle, from 1923 to 1925. McConkie also served in the stake presidency of the Ensign Stake (in Salt Lake City) during the late 1930s and early 1940s. He later served as a member of the church's Sunday School General Board. From 1946 to 1950, McConkie was president of the California Mission, which then included most of California and a large part of Arizona.

== Publications ==
McConkie's writings should not be confused with those by his son, Oscar W. McConkie, Jr.

- McConkie, Oscar W. (1944). The Holy Ghost: A Study of the Holy Ghost, According to the Standard Works of the Church. Salt Lake City, Utah: Deseret Book Company.
- —— (1945). A Dialogue at Golgotha: An Analysis of Judaism and Christianity, and of the Laws, Government and Institutions of the Jews, and the Jewish and Roman Trials of Jesus of Nazareth. Salt Lake City, Utah: Oscar W. McConkie.

== Sources ==
- McConkie, Joseph Fielding. The Bruce R. McConkie Story. (Salt Lake City: Deseret Book, 2003) p. 32-55.
