= Robert L. Millet =

American theologian (born 1947)

- Born: 30 December 1947 (age 78); Baton Rouge, Louisiana
- Education: Florida State University; Brigham Young University
- Spouse: Shauna Sizemore Millet

Robert L. Millet (born 30 December 1947) is a professor of ancient scripture and emeritus Dean of Religious Education at Brigham Young University (BYU) in Provo, Utah. Millet is a Latter-day Saint author and speaker with more than 60 published works on different aspects of Mormonism. Millet was at the forefront of establishing evangelical-Mormon dialogue.

He appears frequently as a commentator on BYUtv and in other visible roles at assorted media outlets as Manager of Outreach and Interfaith Relations for the LDS Church's Public Affairs Department.

Millet is considered one of the foremost scholars on the Joseph Smith Translation (also known as the Inspired Version) of the Bible.

== Life ==
Millet was born and raised in Louisiana where his grandparents had joined the LDS Church. He received a BA and a master's in psychology from BYU, and a Ph.D. from Florida State University in biblical studies and contemporary theology. Millet has been a member of the BYU faculty since 1983.

Millet married Shauna Sizemore Millet at the Salt Lake Temple in 1971; they are the parents of six children.

== Select bibliography ==
- Millet, Robert L.; Christensen, James C. (illustrator) (1999). Parables: And Other Teaching Stories. Shadow Mountain. ISBN 157345558X.
- Millet, Robert L. (2001). "The Historical Jesus: A Latter-day Saint Perspective". In Hoskisson, Paul Y. (ed.). Historicity and the Latter-Day Saint Scriptures. Provo, Utah: Religious Studies Center. ISBN 1-5773-4928-8.
- Millet, Robert L. (2010). Talking With God: Divine Conversations That Transform Daily Life. Deseret Book Company. ISBN 978-1606416549.
- Millet, Robert L., ed. (2011). No Weapon Shall Prosper: New Light on Sensitive Issues. Provo, Utah: Religious Studies Center, in cooperation with Deseret Book Company. ISBN 978-0842527941.

== Selected Speeches ==
- "What We Believe" – March 12, 2013, devotional address at Brigham Young University
