= Brenton G. Yorgason =

Mormon Writer

- Born: May 25, 1945; Mount Pleasant, Utah, U.S.
- Died: October 28, 2016 (aged 71)
- Resting place: Yorgason Family Cemetery, Fountain Green, Utah, U.S.

Brenton G. "Brent" Yorgason (May 25, 1945 in Mount Pleasant, Utah – October 28, 2016) was an American novelist and writer who used themes about members of the Church of Jesus Christ of Latter-day Saints in the United States.

Many of his works were written in cooperation with his brother, Blaine M. Yorgason.

== Bibliography ==
List of works. Some of these books were co-authored with Blaine Yorgason, Margaret Yorgason, Wesley Burr, Terry Baker, Kevin Lund, Richard Myers, Frank Herbert, Sonny Detmer, and Donald Mangum.

- From First Date to Chosen Mate/Dating (1977)
- Others (1978)
- Bishop's Horse Race (1979)
- A Town Called Charity (1980)
- From Two to One (1981)
- The Krystal Promise (1981)
- Creating a Celestial Marriage (1982)
- From This Day Forth (1982)
- Marriage and Family Stewardships (1982)
- Seeker of the Gentle Heart (1982)
- Chester, I Love You (1983)
- Miracle (1983)
- Brother Brigham's Gold (1984)
- Ride the Laughing Wind (1984)
- The Loftier Way/Tales From the Book of Mormon (1985)
- Becoming (1986)
- Family Knights/Dirty Socks and Shining Armor (1986)
- Seven Days For Ruby (1986)
- The Eleven Dollar Surgery (1986)
- The Greatest Quest (1987)
- In Search of Steenie Bergman (1988)
- Pardners (1988)
- The Gospel Power Series (1989) - 12 Pamphlet Books
- Sacred Intimacy (1989)
- Beyond the Pearly Gates (1989)
- Here Stands a Man (1990)
- Spiritual Survival in the Last Days (1990)
- Prayers on the Wind/Storm (1991)
- First Christmas Gift (1991)
- The Garrity Test (1992)
- TY: The Ty Detmer Story (1992)
- Standing Tall: The Shawn Bradley Story (1993)
- Simeon's Touch (1993)
- Tarred and Feathered (1994)
- The Carpenter's Son (1994)
- Quiet Miracles (1994)
- On Wings of Love (1995)
- Amazing Grace (1996)
- All I Really Need to Know I Learned in Primary (1997)
- An Angel's Promise (1997)
- Paradise Creek (1998)
- Cherished Intimacy (1998)
- Wing of Words (1998)
- The Carpenter's Son, Part 2 (1999)
- Last Stagecoach Robbery (1999)
- Understanding Death's Passage (2000)
- Grandma's Apple Tree (2000)
- From Darkness Into Light (2000)
- The Story of Ira A Fulton (2001)
- Life Is So Beautiful: The Mary Lou Fulton Story (2002)
- Capturing Your Dreams (2003)
- Little Known Evidences of the Book of Mormon (2003)
- Man of Vision: The Charles Roy Albright Story (2003)
- Seamless Lives: The Frank and Betty Newman Martino Story (2004)
- All About Jim: The James Leo Thynne Story (2004)
- Restoring Righteous Paths: The Story of Kirk and Paula Wilson Story (2005)
- No Greater Joy: The Life and Labors of H. Kay Pugmire (2006)
- One In Thine Hand: The Garth and Eloise Andrus Story (2006)
- Rori: My Miracle, My Angel (2006)
