= Blaine Yorgason =

American novelist

Blaine Michael Yorgason (December 6, 1942 – October 8, 2024) was an American Latter-day Saint novelist who has also written biographies.

Yorgason was born in Sanpete County, Utah. He graduated from Brigham Young High School and then served as a missionary for the Church of Jesus Christ of Latter-day Saints, primarily in Chicago. Yorgason had bachelor's and master's degrees from Brigham Young University (BYU). He was a seminary teacher in the Church Educational System from 1970 to 1977 and taught at BYU from 1977 to 1980.

Among his works are Windwalker which was made into a 1980 film of the same name and Chester, I Love You (written with his brother, Brent Yorgason) which was adapted for film as The Thanksgiving Promise. Yorgason had also written a biography of John Taylor.

He died on October 8, 2024, in Vernal, Utah.

== Bibliography ==
This is a list of books written by Yorgason. Some of these books were co-authored. Co-writers include: Brent Yorgason, Carl Eaton, Tami Yorgason, Sunny Oaks, Richard Schmutz, and Douglas Alder.

- Miracles and the Latter-day Saint Teenager (1974)
- Charlie's Monument (1976)
- Others (1978)
- Bishop's Horse Race (1979)
- Massacre At Salt Creek/The Courage Covenant/And Should We Die (1979)
- Windwalker (1979)
- A Town Called Charity (1980)
- The Krystal Promise (1981)
- Seeker of the Gentle Heart (1982)
- Double Exposure (1982)
- Chester, I Love You/The Thanksgiving Promise (1983)
- Miracle (1983)
- Brother Brigham's Gold (1984)
- Ride the Laughing Wind (1984)
- Shadowtaker (1985)
- The Loftier Way/Tales From the Book of Mormon (1985)
- Becoming (1986)
- Bfpstk and the Smile Song/Into The Rainbow (1986)
- Seven Days For Ruby (1986)
- The Eleven Dollar Surgery (1986)
- The Greatest Quest (1987)
- In Search of Steenie Bergman (1988)
- Pardners (1988)
- The Gospel Power Series (1989) - 12 Pamphlet Books
- Decision Point (1989)
- Here Stands a Man (1990)
- Spiritual Survival in the Last Days (1990)
- The Warm Spirit (1990)
- Prayers on the Wind/Storm (1991)
- Secrets (1992)
- To Soar With Eagles (1993)
- Spiritual Progression in the Last Days (1994)
- Tarred and Feathered (1994)
- One Tattered Angel (1995)
- Ascending/Angus Austin Rising (1996)
- Hearts Afire: At All Hazards (1997)
- Hearts Afire: Fort on the Firing Line (1999)
- New Evidences of Christ in America (1999)
- Gabriel's Well (2000)
- Hearts Afire: Curly Bill's Gift (2000)
- Harold B. Lee (2001)
- Joseph F. Smith (2001)
- John Taylor (2002)
- Girl At the Crossing (2002)
- I Need Thee Every Hour (2003)
- Finding Mercie (2010)
- All That Was Promised: The St. George Temple and the Unfolding of the Restoration (2013) with Richard A. Schmutz and Douglas D. Alder.

== Sources ==
- Blaine Yorgason at the MLCA Database
- BY High Alumni article on Yorgason
- Barnes and Noble listing for Yorgason
