= Kimball (surname) =

Kimball is a surname, and may refer to:

Note: A person may be listed in more than one section.

== Architects ==
- Francis H. Kimball (1845–1919), American architect best known for his work on skyscrapers in lower Manhattan
- John Kimball Sr. (1758–1831), American architect
- Thomas Rogers Kimball (1862–1934), American architect

== Artists and animators ==
- Alonzo Myron Kimball (1874–1923), American portrait artist and illustrator
- Myron Holly Kimball (1827-1912), American photographer, real estate speculator, and collector
- Katharine Kimball (1866–1949), American artist, illustrator and etcher
- Ward Kimball (1914–2002), one of Walt Disney's main animators, the "Nine Old Men"

== Jurists and lawyers ==
- Catherine D. Kimball, Chief Justice of the Louisiana Supreme Court
- Derrick Kimball (born 1954), Canadian lawyer and former politician
- Edward L. Kimball (1930–2016), American scholar, lawyer, law professor and historian
- Ralph Kimball (judge), Associate Justice of the Wyoming Supreme Court

== Musicians ==
- Bobby Kimball (born 1947), the lead and background singer in the American rock/pop band Toto
- Cheyenne Kimball (born 1990), American singer
- Jennifer Kimball, vocalist, songwriter, and multi-instrumentalist who was part of The Story along with Jonatha Brooke
- Jim Kimball (1965 or 1966–2025), American punk drummer

== Mormons ==
- Andrew Kimball (1858–1924), American politician and a mission president and stake president in The Church of Jesus Christ of Latter-day Saints, son of Heber Kimball
- Heber C. Kimball (1801–1868), leader in the early Latter Day Saint movement
- Helen Mar Kimball (1828–1896), one of Joseph Smith's wives
- Spencer W. Kimball (1895–1985), 12th president of The Church of Jesus Christ of Latter-day Saints

== Politicians ==
- Alanson M. Kimball (1827–1913), U.S. Representative from Wisconsin
- Alonzo Kimball (1808–1900), 14th & 16th mayor of Green Bay, Wisconsin
- Andrew Kimball (1858–1924), American politician and Mormon
- Clem F. Kimball (1868–1928), Iowa Lieutenant Governor
- Derrick Kimball (born 1954), Canadian lawyer and former politician
- Fenner Kimball (1822–1899), American manufacturer, businessman and politician
- Henry M. Kimball (1878–1935), U.S. Representative from Michigan
- John W. Kimball (1828–1910), American soldier and politician who served as Massachusetts Auditor
- Marcus Kimball, Baron Kimball (1928–2014), British Conservative politician
- Martin L. Kimball (1826–1891), Wisconsin state senator
- Mary Ann Kimball, New Hampshire state legislator
- Philip Kimball (1918-2005), Massachusetts state legislator
- Shelby Kimball, American politician
- William P. Kimball (1857–1926), U.S. Representative from Kentucky

== Soldiers ==
- Ivory Kimball (1843–1916), Union Army soldier
- John W. Kimball (1828–1910), American soldier and politician who served as Massachusetts Auditor
- Nathan Kimball (1822–1898), American Civil War general
- William Wirt Kimball (1848–1930), U.S. naval officer

== Sports figures ==
- Bruce Kimball (born 1963), American diver and coach
- Charlie Kimball, American racecar driver
- Dick Kimball (born c. 1935), American former diver and coach
- Eddie Kimball (1903–1990), American football player, football and basketball coach, and college athletics administrator
- Jeremy Kimball (born 1991), American mixed martial arts fighter
- Mary Ellen Kimball, All-American Girls Professional Baseball League player
- Nikki Kimball (born 1971), American ultramarathoner
- Toby Kimball (1942–2017), American National Basketball Association player

== Writers ==
- Dan Kimball, author
- George E Kimball III (1943–2011), author
- Harriet McEwen Kimball (1834–1917), American poet, hymnwriter, philanthropist, hospital co-founder
- Maria Brace Kimball (1852–1933), American educator, elocutionist, writer
- Michael Kimball (born 1967), American novelist
- Roger Kimball (born 1953), conservative U.S art critic, essayist, and social commentator

== Others ==
- Christopher Kimball, cooking magazine editor and TV host
- Donna Kimball, American muppeteer
- Edward Kimball (1859–1938), American stage and silent film actor
- Edward Kimball (1823-1901), Sunday School teacher and church debt raiser
- George E. Kimball, pioneer of Operations Research
- Hannibal Kimball, nineteenth century entrepreneur
- Martha Kimball (1840-1892), American philanthropist
- Ralph Kimball, author of publications on data warehousing and business intelligence
- Scott Lee Kimball, convicted serial killer
- Solon Toothaker Kimball, noted educator and anthropologist
- Sumner Increase Kimball (1832-1924), organizer of and general superintendent of the United States Life-Saving Service, predecessor of the United States Coast Guard
- William Wallace Kimball (1828–1904), Chicago piano manufacturer and founder of the Kimball Piano Company, now Kimball International
