= Edward Kimball (disambiguation) =

Edward Kimball (1859–1938) was an American stage and silent film actor.

Edward Kimball may also refer to:

- Edward L. Kimball (1930–2016), American legal scholar
- Edward P. Kimball (1882–1937), American organist and hymnwriter
- Ted Kimball (Edward Beatie Kimball, 1910–1985), American radio host
- Edward Kimball (teacher) (1823–1901), Sunday School teacher and church debt raiser

== See also ==
- Kimball (surname)
