= Spencer Kimball =

Spencer Kimball may refer to:

- Spencer W. Kimball (1895–1985), 12th president of The Church of Jesus Christ of Latter-day Saints
- Spencer L. Kimball, American lawyer and legal academic; son of Spencer W. Kimball
- Spencer Kimball (computer programmer), American computer programmer; great-grandson of Spencer W. Kimball
