= SS George Dewey =

Liberty ship of WWII

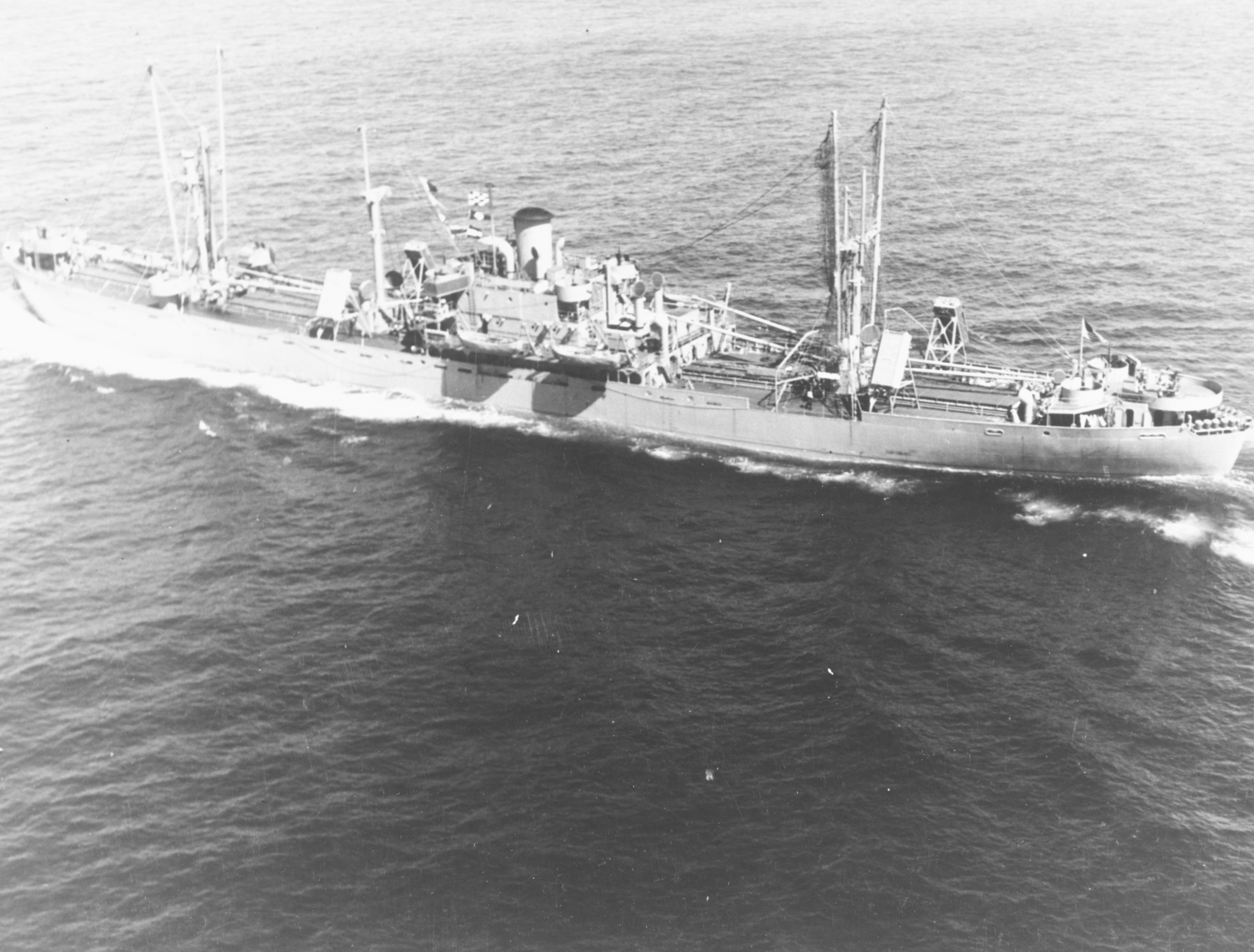
- George Dewey

History

United States
- Name: George Dewey
- Namesake: George Dewey
- Owner: War Shipping Administration (WSA)
- Operator: American Export Lines Inc.
- Ordered: as type (EC2-S-C1) hull, MC hull 1202
- Builder: St. Johns River Shipbuilding Company, Jacksonville, Florida
- Cost: $2,069,174
- Yard number: 10
- Way number: 4
- Laid down: 8 May 1943
- Launched: 5 August 1943
- Sponsored by: Rear Admiral Walter Browne Woodson
- Completed: 27 August 1943
- Identification: Call sign: KIWD
- Fate: Placed in the Hudson River Reserve Fleet, Jones Point, New York, 6 January 1948; Placed in the National Defense Reserve Fleet, Beaumont, Texas, 31 May 1952; Turned over to Texas, for use as artificial reef, 6 August 1975, withdrawn from fleet, 12 August 1975

General characteristics
- Class & type: Liberty ship; type EC2-S-C1, standard
- Tonnage: 10,865 LT DWT; 7,176 GRT
- Displacement: 3,380 long tons (3,434 t) (light); 14,245 long tons (14,474 t) (max)
- Length: 441 feet 6 inches (135 m) oa; 416 feet (127 m) pp; 427 feet (130 m) lwl
- Beam: 57 feet (17 m)
- Draft: 27 ft 9.25 in (8.4646 m)
- Installed power: 2 × Oil fired 450 °F (232 °C) boilers, operating at 220 psi (1,500 kPa); 2,500 hp (1,900 kW)
- Propulsion: 1 × triple-expansion steam engine, (manufactured by General Machinery Corp., Hamilton, Ohio); 1 × screw propeller
- Speed: 11.5 knots (21.3 km/h; 13.2 mph)
- Capacity: 562,608 cubic feet (15,931 m^{3}) (grain); 499,573 cubic feet (14,146 m^{3}) (bale)
- Complement: 38–62 USMM; 21–40 USNAG
- Armament: Varied by ship; Bow-mounted 3-inch (76 mm)/50-caliber gun; Stern-mounted 4-inch (102 mm)/50-caliber gun; 2–8 × single 20-millimeter (0.79 in) Oerlikon anti-aircraft (AA) cannons and/or, 2–8 × 37-millimeter (1.46 in) M1 AA guns

SS George Dewey was a Liberty ship built in the United States during World War II. She was named after George Dewey, the only person in United States history to obtain the rank Admiral of the Navy. Dewey was a graduate of the United States Naval Academy and fought in both the American Civil War and the Spanish–American War.

== Construction ==
George Dewey was laid down on 8 May 1943, under a Maritime Commission (MARCOM) contract, MC hull 1202, by the St. Johns River Shipbuilding Company, Jacksonville, Florida; she was sponsored by Rear Admiral Walter Browne Woodson, she was launched on 5 August 1943.

== History ==
She was allocated to American Export Lines Inc., on 27 August 1943. On 1 January 1948, she was placed in the Hudson River Reserve Fleet, Jones Point, New York. On 31 May 1952, she was laid up in the National Defense Reserve Fleet, Beaumont, Texas. She was turned over for use as an artificial reef, on 6 August 1975, to the state of Texas. She was withdrawn from the fleet, 12 August 1975.

She was sunk on 25 April 1976, at 28°06′58″N 96°05′14″W along with her sister ships Jim Bridger, sunk on 15 June 1976, and Dwight L. Moody, sunk on 6 April 1976.

== Bibliography ==
- "St. John's River Shipbuilding, Jacksonville FL". www.ShipbuildingHistory.com. 16 October 2010.
- Maritime Administration. "George Dewey". Ship History Database Vessel Status Card. U.S. Department of Transportation, Maritime Administration.
- Davies, James (May 2004). "Specifications (As-Built)" (PDF). p. 23.
- "SS George Dewey".
- Arnold, J. Barto III; Goloboy, Jennifer L.; Hall, Andrew W.; Hall, Rebecca A. (December 1998). Shively, J. Dale (ed.). Texas' Liberty Ships: From World War II Working-class heroes to Artificial Reefs (PDF). Texas Parks & Wildlife.
