= Andrew Kimball =

American politician (1858–1924)

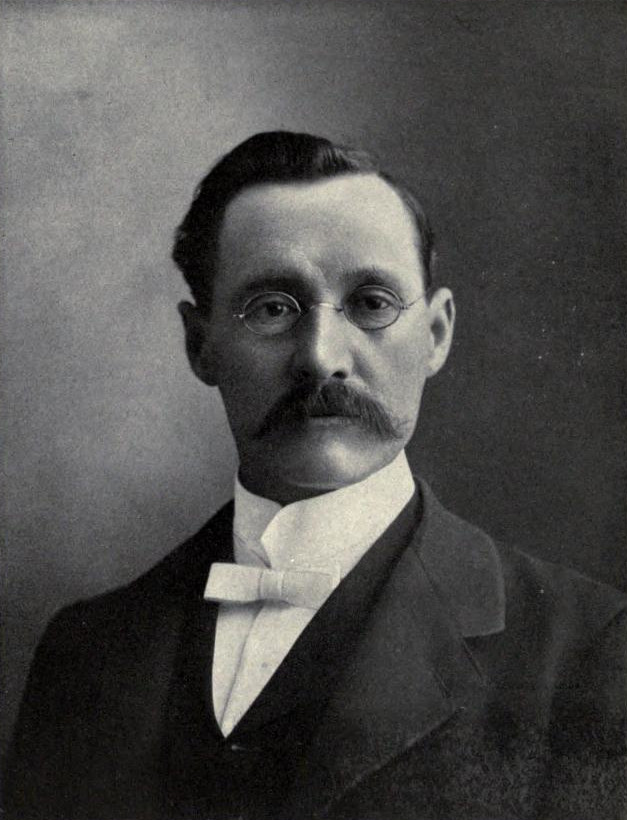
Andrew Kimball

Andrew Kimball (September 6, 1858 – August 31, 1924) was a member of the Arizona Territorial Legislature, and a mission president and stake president in the Church of Jesus Christ of Latter-day Saints (LDS Church).

== Biography ==
Kimball was a son of Heber C. Kimball and one of his wives, Ann Alice Gheen. Andrew Kimball served as an LDS Church missionary in what is now Oklahoma and for 12 years served as president of the Indian Territory Mission. For most of this time he worked as a salesman in Utah and Idaho while overseeing the operations of the mission. Kimball served as a member of the Utah State Constitutional Convention in 1895.

Kimball was married to Olive Woolley, a daughter of Edwin D. Woolley. Among their children was Spencer W. Kimball, who would later serve as president of the LDS Church.

In 1898, Kimball was called to serve as president of the St. Joseph Stake based in Thatcher, Arizona. He moved his family from Salt Lake City and spent the rest of his life in Arizona, serving as stake president for 26 years.

During his term in the Arizona legislature Kimball served as the chairman of the agricultural and horticultural commission.

He died in Salt Lake City on August 31, 1924.

In 2011, BYU Studies published a biography of Kimball by his grandson, Edward L. Kimball.
