= SS Dwight L. Moody =

Liberty ship of WWII

History

United States
- Name: Dwight L. Moody
- Namesake: Dwight L. Moody
- Owner: War Shipping Administration (WSA)
- Operator: Lykes Bros. Steamship Co., Inc.
- Ordered: as type (EC2-S-C1) hull, MC hull 1526
- Builder: J.A. Jones Construction, Panama City, Florida
- Cost: $1,847,690
- Yard number: 8
- Way number: 2
- Laid down: 4 March 1943
- Launched: 28 June 1943
- Completed: 24 July 1943
- Identification: Call Signal: KORS
- Fate: Laid up in the National Defense Reserve Fleet, James River Group, 29 May 1946; Laid up in the National Defense Reserve Fleet, Beaumont, Texas, 23 January 1950; Turned over to Texas, for use as artificial reef, 1 July 1975

General characteristics
- Class & type: Liberty ship; type EC2-S-C1, standard
- Tonnage: 10,865 LT DWT; 7,176 GRT
- Displacement: 3,380 long tons (3,434 t) (light); 14,245 long tons (14,474 t) (max)
- Length: 441 feet 6 inches (135 m) oa; 416 feet (127 m) pp; 427 feet (130 m) lwl
- Beam: 57 feet (17 m)
- Draft: 27 ft 9.25 in (8.4646 m)
- Installed power: 2 × Oil fired 450 °F (232 °C) boilers, operating at 220 psi (1,500 kPa); 2,500 hp (1,900 kW)
- Propulsion: 1 × triple-expansion steam engine, (manufactured by Vulcan Iron Works, Wilkes-Barre, Pennsylvania); 1 × screw propeller
- Speed: 11.5 knots (21.3 km/h; 13.2 mph)
- Capacity: 562,608 cubic feet (15,931 m^{3}) (grain); 499,573 cubic feet (14,146 m^{3}) (bale)
- Complement: 38–62 USMM; 21–40 USNAG
- Armament: Varied by ship; Bow-mounted 3-inch (76 mm)/50-caliber gun; Stern-mounted 4-inch (102 mm)/50-caliber gun; 2–8 × single 20-millimeter (0.79 in) Oerlikon anti-aircraft (AA) cannons and/or, 2–8 × 37-millimeter (1.46 in) M1 AA guns

SS Dwight L. Moody was a Liberty ship built in the United States during World War II. She was named after Dwight L. Moody, evangelist, publisher, the founder of the Moody Church, Northfield School and Mount Hermon School in Massachusetts, now Northfield Mount Hermon School, the Moody Bible Institute, and Moody Publishers.

== Construction ==
Dwight L. Moody was laid down on 4 March 1943, under a Maritime Commission (MARCOM) contract, MC hull 1526, by J.A. Jones Construction, Panama City, Florida; she was launched on 28 June 1943.

== History ==
She was allocated to Lykes Bros. Steamship Co., Inc., on 24 July 1943. On 29 May 1946, she was laid up in the National Defense Reserve Fleet, in the James River Group. On 23 January 1950, she was laid up in the National Defense Reserve Fleet, in Beaumont, Texas. On 1 July 1975, she was turned over to the state of Texas, for use as an artificial reef. She was removed from the fleet on 9 July 1975.

She was sunk on 6 April 1976, at 28°06′58″N 96°05′14″W, along with her sister ships Jim Bridger, sunk on 15 June 1976, and George Dewey, sunk on 25 April 1976.

== Bibliography ==
- "Jones Construction, Panama City FL". www.ShipbuildingHistory.com. 13 October 2010.
- Maritime Administration. "Dwight L. Moody". Ship History Database Vessel Status Card. U.S. Department of Transportation, Maritime Administration.
- Davies, James (May 2004). "Specifications (As-Built)" (PDF). p. 23.
- "SS Dwight L. Moody".
- Arnold, J. Barto III; Goloboy, Jennifer L.; Hall, Andrew W.; Hall, Rebecca A. (December 1998). Shively, J. Dale (ed.). Texas' Liberty Ships: From World War II Working-class heroes to Artificial Reefs (PDF). Texas Parks & Wildlife.
