= Mount Vernon Church (Boston) =

Historic church in Boston

Coordinates: 42°21′32.7″N 71°3′44.57″W

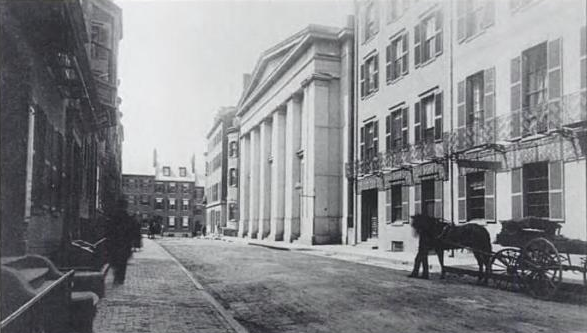
Mt. Vernon Church (built 1844), Ashburton Place, Boston, c. 1870s

Mount Vernon Church (established 1842) in Boston, Massachusetts, was a Congregational church located on Beacon Hill (1844–1891) and later in Back Bay (1892–present).

== History ==
=== Beacon Hill, 1844–1891 ===
The Mount Vernon Church was organized on June 1, 1842, and the church building on Ashburton Place in Beacon Hill was completed the next year. Senior ministers to serve the congregation at this location included Edward Norris Kirk (1842–1874); and Samuel Edward Herrick (1871–1904).

Congregants included Edward Kimball, Dwight L. Moody and Daniel Safford. In the 1850s some of the congregation formed the Mount Vernon Association of Young Men. In 1874, the church ordained Joseph Hardy Neesima, the first Japanese person ordained as a Christian Protestant minister.

In 1893 after the Tremont Temple burned down, its Baptist congregation held services in the Mt. Vernon Church building. It had been vacated recently by the Mt. Vernon congregation, which moved to a new location in Back Bay.

=== Back Bay, 1892–present ===
Around 1892 C. Howard Walker designed a new church building in the Back Bay, on the corner of Beacon Street and Massachusetts Avenue. The new building included stained glass windows made by John LaFarge. The Whidden Building company who built many other buildings in the Boston area constructed the church.

Senior ministers at the Back Bay location included:

- Samuel Edward Herrick (1871–1904)
- Albert Parker Fitch (1905–1909)
- James E. Richard (1909–1918)
- Sidney Lovett (1919–1932)
- Carl Heath Kopf (1933–1948)
- Dwight C. Smith (1949–1953)
- Chalmers Coe (1954–1956)

(After covenant with Old South Church)

- Frederick M. Meek (1970–1973)
- James Walter Crawford, Jr. (1974–2002)
- Carl F. Schultz, Jr. (2002–2005) [Interim]
- Nancy S. Taylor (2005–

In 1970, the membership of the Mount Vernon Church closed the church building and entered into a covenant with the Old South Church in Boston to worship in fellowship with the Old South at its church at 645 Boylston Street (Copley Square). Mount Vernon Church retains separate officers and budget, an overlapping membership with Old South, and separate status as a member church in the Metropolitan Boston Association of the United Church of Christ.

A fire in 1978 destroyed the church building. In 1983 the remains were remodelled by architect Graham Gund as the "Church Court Condominiums."

== Images ==
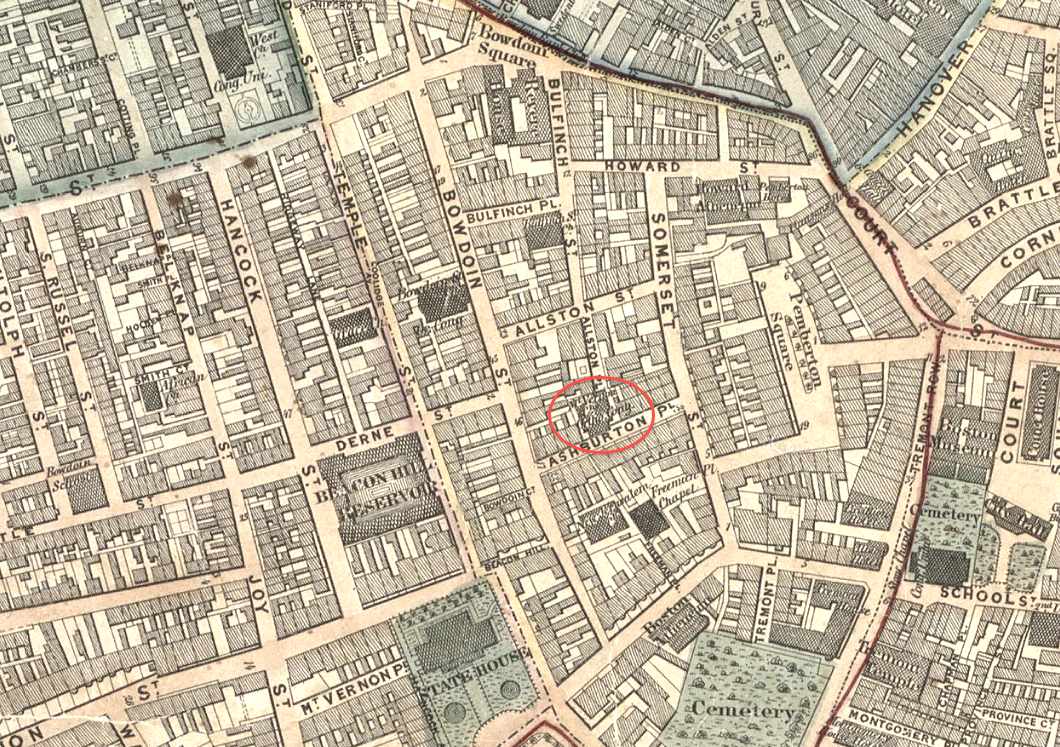
Detail of map of Boston, 1852, showing location of church

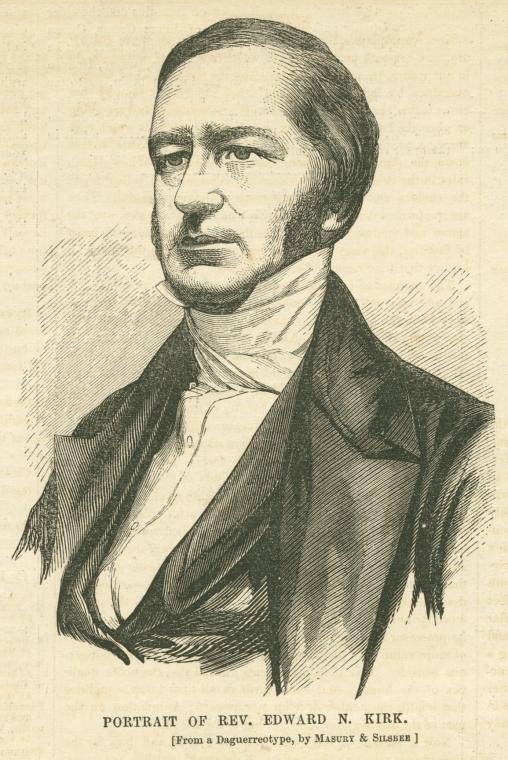
Portrait of minister Edward N. Kirk; from a photo by Masury & Silsbee, 19th century

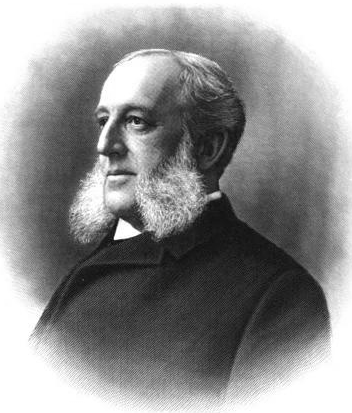
Portrait of Samuel E. Herrick, minister

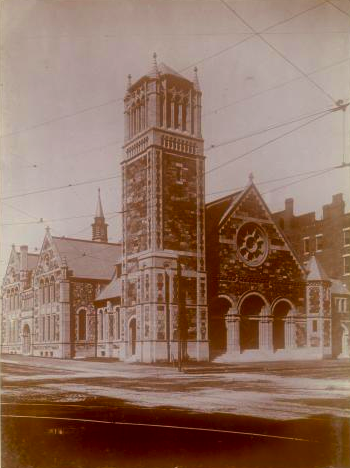
Mt. Vernon Church, corner Beacon Street and Massachusetts Ave., Boston (built 1892)
