= Edward Norris Kirk =

American missionary, pastor, teacher (1802–1874)

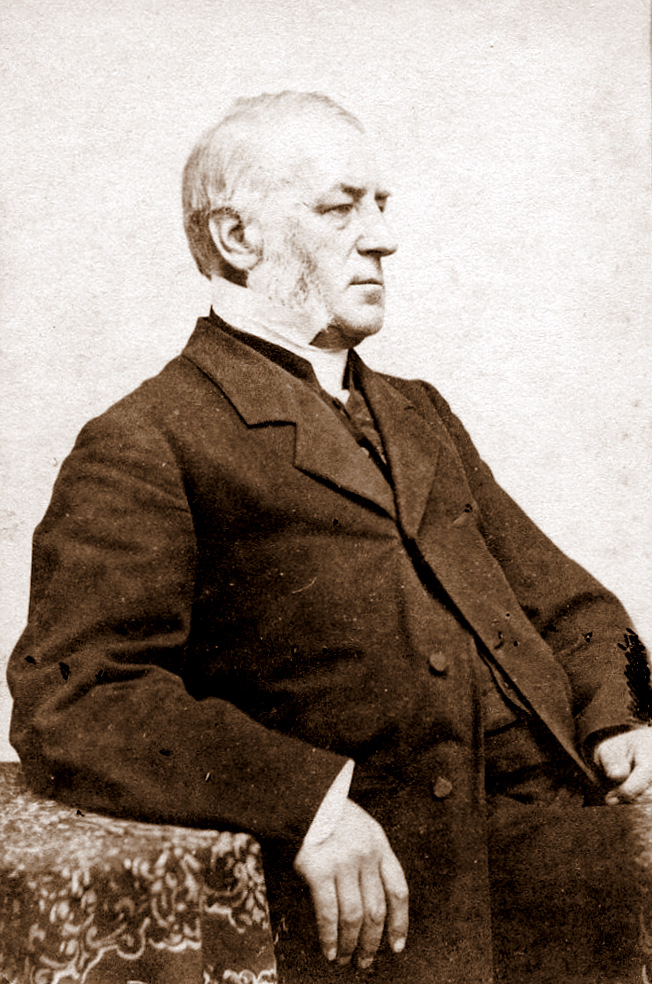
- Born: August 14, 1802
- Died: March 27, 1874 (aged 71); Boston
- Education: Princeton Theological Seminary
- Occupations: Christian missionary, pastor, teacher, evangelist and writer

Ecclesiastical career
- Church: Presbyterian, Congregational, revivalist
- Writings: Lectures on Christ's Parables; Canon of the Holy Scriptures; Lectures on Revivals
- Congregations: Second Presbyterian Church and Fourth Presbyterian Church, Albany, New York; Mount Vernon Congregational Church

Edward Norris Kirk (August 14, 1802 – March 27, 1874), was a Christian missionary, pastor, teacher, evangelist and writer in the Presbyterian, Congregational and revivalist traditions in the US. He founded the Fourth Presbyterian Church, Albany, New York, following a schism at the Second Presbyterian Church in the same city, and later served as the first pastor of Mount Vernon Congregational Church (now associated with Old South Church) in Boston, from 1842 to 1871, where his teaching led to the conversion of renowned evangelist Dwight L. Moody.

== Life ==
Kirk was educated at Princeton Theological Seminary under Dr. Archibald Alexander, and after graduating worked as an agent for the Board of Foreign Missions. In 1824, he helped to create the Chi Phi Society, a semi-religious, semi-literary organization, which ceased activity the following year when it merged with the Philadelphian Society. In 1827, he was appointed assistant pastor of the Second Presbyterian church in Albany, New York, where William Sprague later ministered, and in 1828 he organized the Fourth Presbyterian church in Albany, after controversy at Second church resulted in a church division partly due to the revivalism techniques then being popularized by Charles Grandison Finney. With Dr. Nathan S. S. Beman of Troy, New York, Kirk established a training school which taught theology for aspiring evangelists. After a time preaching in London and Paris, Kirk returned to the United States and took up the pastorate at Mount Vernon which he held for nearly 30 years. He was invited by the American Foreign Christian Union to "proceed to Paris for five months as a special commissioner to attend to the establishment of an American congregation and house of worship" in that city. Dr. Kirk sailed on the steamer Asia, arriving in Paris February 6, 1857, and during his time there until September was able to secure the charter for the American Church in Paris from Napoleon III and secured the purchase of the first building of the American Church in Paris located at 21 rue de Berri. He returned to Boston in September 1857. Although the American Foreign Christian Union urged him to consider the acceptance of the post of Chaplain to the infant church, he felt the claims of his church in Boston were pressing. He remained with the Mount Vernon congregation until his death, March 27, 1874, in Boston.

== Works ==
Dr. Edward Norris Kirk was author of the following publications;

- Memorial of the Reverend John Chester, D.D. (Albany, 1829)
- Lectures on Christ's Parables (New York, 1856)
- Sermons (2 vols, 1840; Boston, 1860)
- Canon of the Holy Scriptures (abridged, 1862)
- Translations of Gaussen's Inspiration of the Scriptures (New York, 1842)" and Jean Frederic Astie's Lectures on Louis XIV. and the Writers of his Age (Boston. 1855).
- Lectures on Revivals, edited by Reverend Daniel O. Mears (Boston, 1874).
