= Dwight L. Moody =

American evangelist (1837–1899)

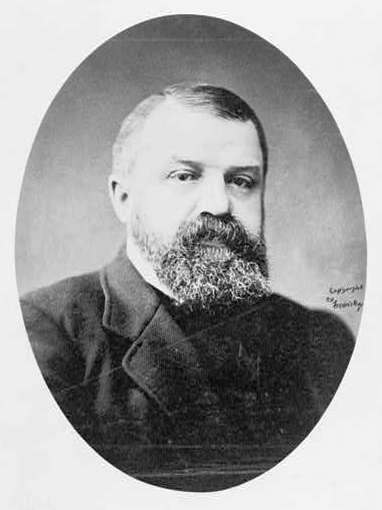
- Moody, c. 1899
- Born: Dwight Lyman Moody; February 5, 1837; Northfield, Massachusetts, U.S.
- Died: December 22, 1899 (aged 62); Northfield, Massachusetts, U.S.
- Occupations: Evangelist and publisher
- Spouse: Emma C. Revell (m. 1862)
- Children: 3, including Paul Dwight Moody

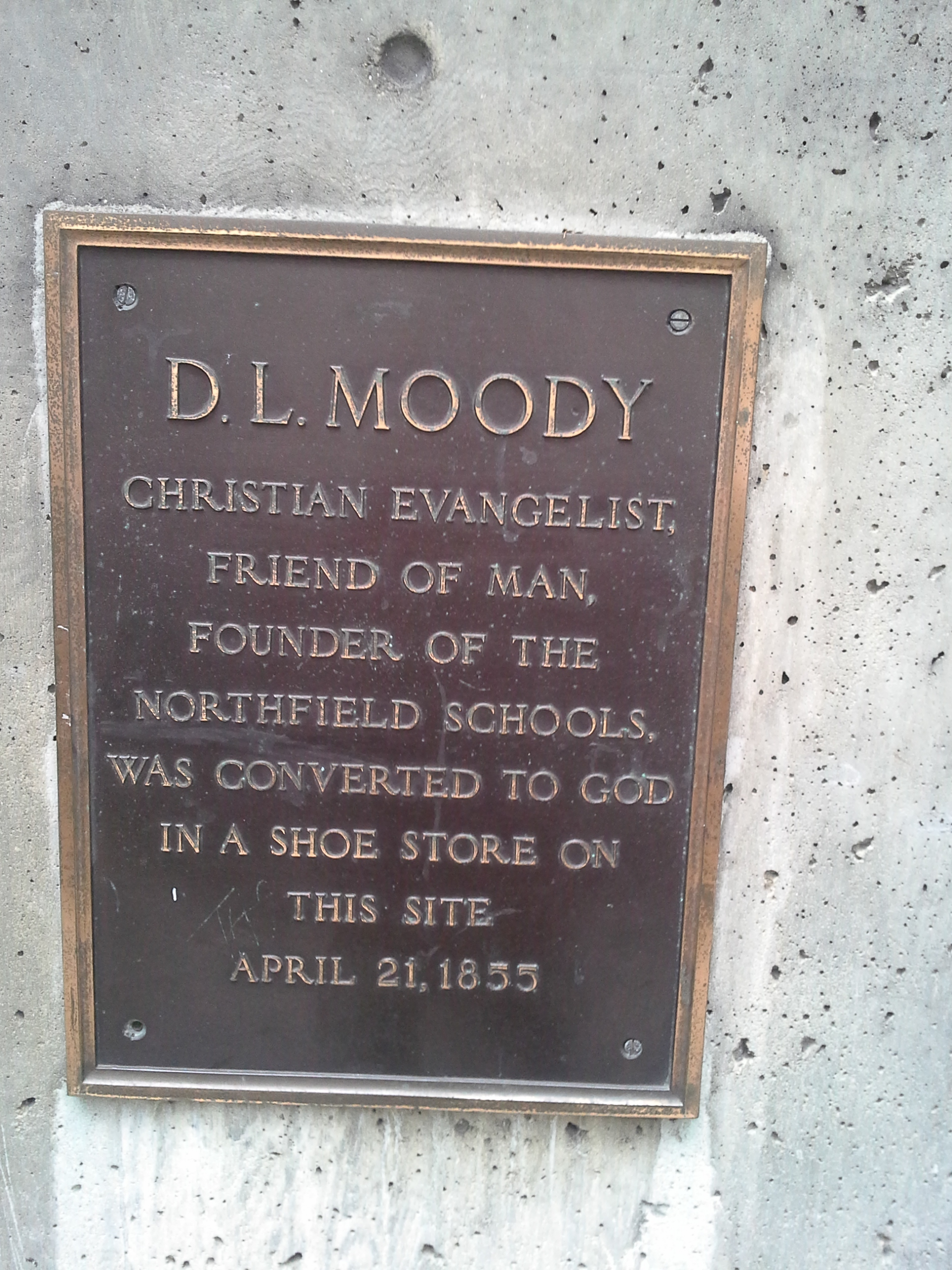
Plaque commemorating the spot on Court Street in Boston where Dwight Moody was converted in 1855 by Edward Kimball

Dwight Lyman Moody (February 5, 1837 – December 22, 1899), also known as D. L. Moody, was an American evangelist and publisher connected with Keswickianism, who founded the Moody Church, Northfield School and Mount Hermon School in Massachusetts (now Northfield Mount Hermon School), Moody Bible Institute, and Moody Publishers. One of his most famous quotes was "Faith makes all things possible... Love makes all things easy." Moody gave up his lucrative boot and shoe business to devote his life to revivalism, working first in the Civil War with Union troops through YMCA in the United States Christian Commission. In Chicago, he built one of the major evangelical centers in the nation, which is still active. Working with singer Ira Sankey, he toured the country and the British Isles, drawing large crowds with a dynamic speaking style.

== Early life ==
Moody was born in Northfield, Massachusetts, as the seventh child of a large family. His father Edwin J. Moody (1800–1841) was a farmer and stonemason. His mother was Betsey Moody (née Holton; 1805–1896). They had five sons and a daughter before Dwight's birth. His father died when Dwight was age four; fraternal twins, a boy, and a girl were born one month after the father's death. Their mother struggled to support the nine children, and she found it necessary to send some off to work for their room and board. Dwight too was sent off, where he received cornmeal porridge and milk three times a day. He complained to his mother, but when she learned that he was getting all he wanted to eat, she sent him back. During this time, she continued to send the children to church. Together with his eight siblings, Dwight was raised in the Unitarian church. His oldest brother ran away and was not heard from by the family until many years later.

When Moody turned 17, he moved to Boston to work (after receiving many job rejections locally) in an uncle's shoe store. One of the uncle's requirements was that Moody attend the Congregational Church of Mount Vernon, where Dr. Edward Norris Kirk served as the pastor. In April 1855 Moody was converted to evangelical Christianity when his Sunday school teacher, Edward Kimball, talked to him about how much God loved him. His conversion sparked the start of his career as an evangelist. Moody first applied to the church in May 1855, and he was received as a church member on May 4, 1856.

According to Moody's memoir, his teacher, Edward Kimball, said:

I can truly say, and in saying it I magnify the infinite grace of God as bestowed upon him, that I have seen few persons whose minds were spiritually darker than was his when he came into my Sunday School class; and I think that the committee of the Mount Vernon Church seldom met an applicant for membership more unlikely ever to become a Christian of clear and decided views of Gospel truth, still less to fill any extended sphere of public usefulness.

== Civil War ==
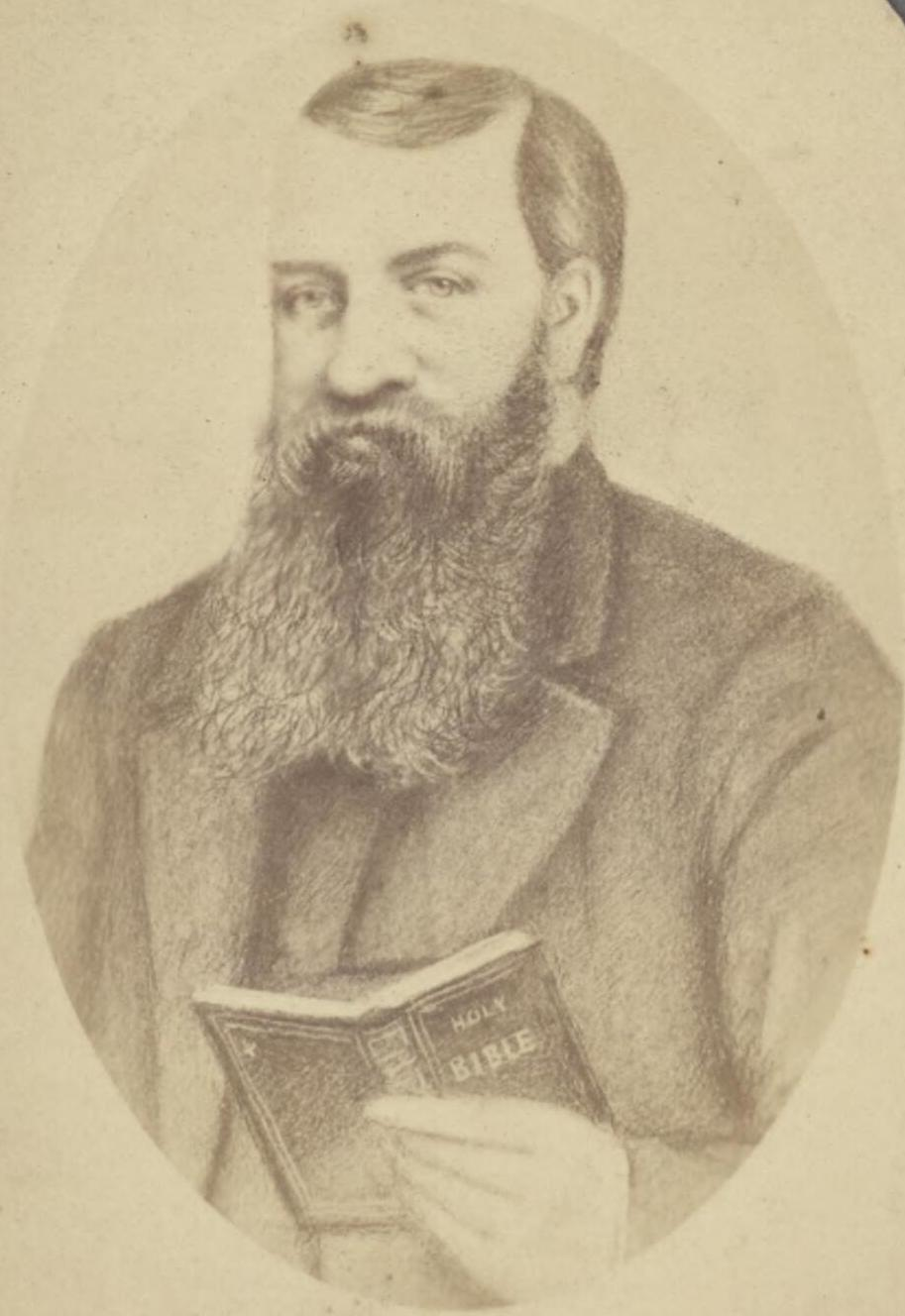
Dwight Lyman Moody c. 1870

The first meeting I ever saw him at was in a little old shanty that had been abandoned by a saloon-keeper. Mr. Moody had got the place to hold the meetings at night. I went there a little late; and the first thing I saw was a man standing up with a few tallow candles around him, holding a negro boy, and trying to read to him the story of the Prodigal Son and a great many words he could not readout, and had to skip. I thought, 'If the Lord can ever use such an instrument as that for His honor and glory, it will astonish me.' As a result of his tireless labor, within a year the average attendance at his school was 650, while 60 volunteers from various churches served as teachers. It became so well known that the just-elected President Lincoln visited and spoke at a Sunday School meeting on November 25, 1860.

Moody "could not conscientiously enlist" in the Union army during the Civil War, later describing himself as "a Quaker" in this respect. After the Civil War started, he became involved with the United States Christian Commission of YMCA. He paid nine visits to the battlefront, being present among the Union soldiers after the Battle of Shiloh and the Battle of Stones River; he also entered Richmond, Virginia, with the troops of General Ulysses S. Grant.

On August 28, 1862, Moody married Emma C. Revell, with whom he had a daughter, Emma Reynolds Moody, and two sons, William Revell Moody and Paul Dwight Moody.

== Chicago and the postwar years ==
Moody's first Sunday school class, North Market Hall, Chicago, 1876

In 1858, he started a Sunday school. The growing Sunday School congregation needed a permanent home, so Moody started a church in Chicago, the Illinois Street Church in 1864. In June 1871 at an International Sunday School Convention in Indianapolis, Indiana, Moody met Ira D. Sankey. He was a gospel singer with whom Moody began to cooperate and collaborate. In October 1871, the Great Chicago Fire destroyed Moody's church building as well as his house and those of most of his congregation. Many had to flee the flames, saving only their lives and ending up completely destitute. Moody, reporting on the disaster, said about his own situation that he "saved nothing but his reputation and his Bible."

In the years after the fire, Moody's wealthy Chicago patron John V. Farwell tried to persuade him to make his permanent home in the city, offering to build a new house for Moody and his family. But Moody, also sought by supporters in New York, Philadelphia, and elsewhere, chose a tranquil farm he had purchased near his birthplace in Northfield, Massachusetts. He felt he could better recover from his lengthy preaching trips in a rural setting.

Northfield became an important location in evangelical Christian history in the late 19th century as Moody organized summer conferences. These were led and attended by prominent Christian preachers and evangelists from around the world. Western Massachusetts has had a rich evangelical tradition including Jonathan Edwards preaching in colonial Northampton and C.I. Scofield preaching in Northfield. A protégé of Moody founded Moores Corner Church in Leverett, Massachusetts. Moody founded two schools there: Northfield School for Girls, founded in 1879, and the Mount Hermon School for Boys, founded in 1881. In the late 20th century these merged, forming today's co-educational, nondenominational Northfield Mount Hermon School.

=== Evangelistic travels ===
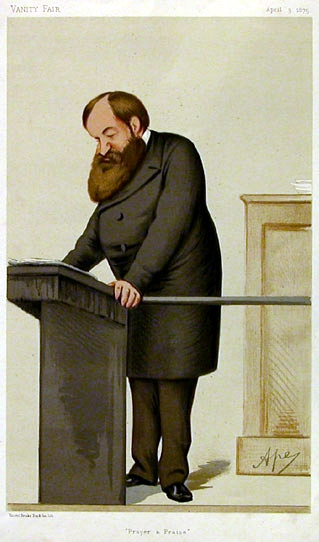
Dwight Lyman Moody, Vanity Fair, April 3, 1875

During a trip to the United Kingdom in the spring of 1872, Moody became well known as an evangelist. Literary works published by the Moody Bible Institute claim that he was the greatest evangelist of the 19th century. He preached almost a hundred times and came into communion with the Plymouth Brethren. On several occasions, he filled stadia of a capacity of 2,000 to 4,000. According to his memoir, in the Botanic Gardens Palace, he attracted an audience estimated at between 15,000 and 30,000.

That turnout continued throughout 1874 and 1875, with crowds of thousands at all of his meetings. During his visit to Scotland, Moody was helped and encouraged by Andrew Bonar. London Baptist preacher Charles Spurgeon invited him to speak, and Spurgeon promoted Moody's preaching. When Moody returned to the US, he was said to frequently attract crowds of 12,000 to 20,000, such crowds being as common as they had been in England. President Grant and some of his cabinet officials attended a Moody meeting on January 19, 1876. Moody held evangelistic meetings from Boston to New York, throughout New England, and as far west as San Francisco, also visiting other West Coast towns from Vancouver, British Columbia, Canada to San Diego.

Moody aided the work of cross-cultural evangelism by promoting the Wordless Book, a teaching tool Spurgeon had developed in 1866. In 1875, Moody added a fourth color to the design of the three-color evangelistic device: gold, to "represent heaven." This "book" has been and is still used to teach uncounted thousands of illiterate people, young and old, around the globe about the gospel message.

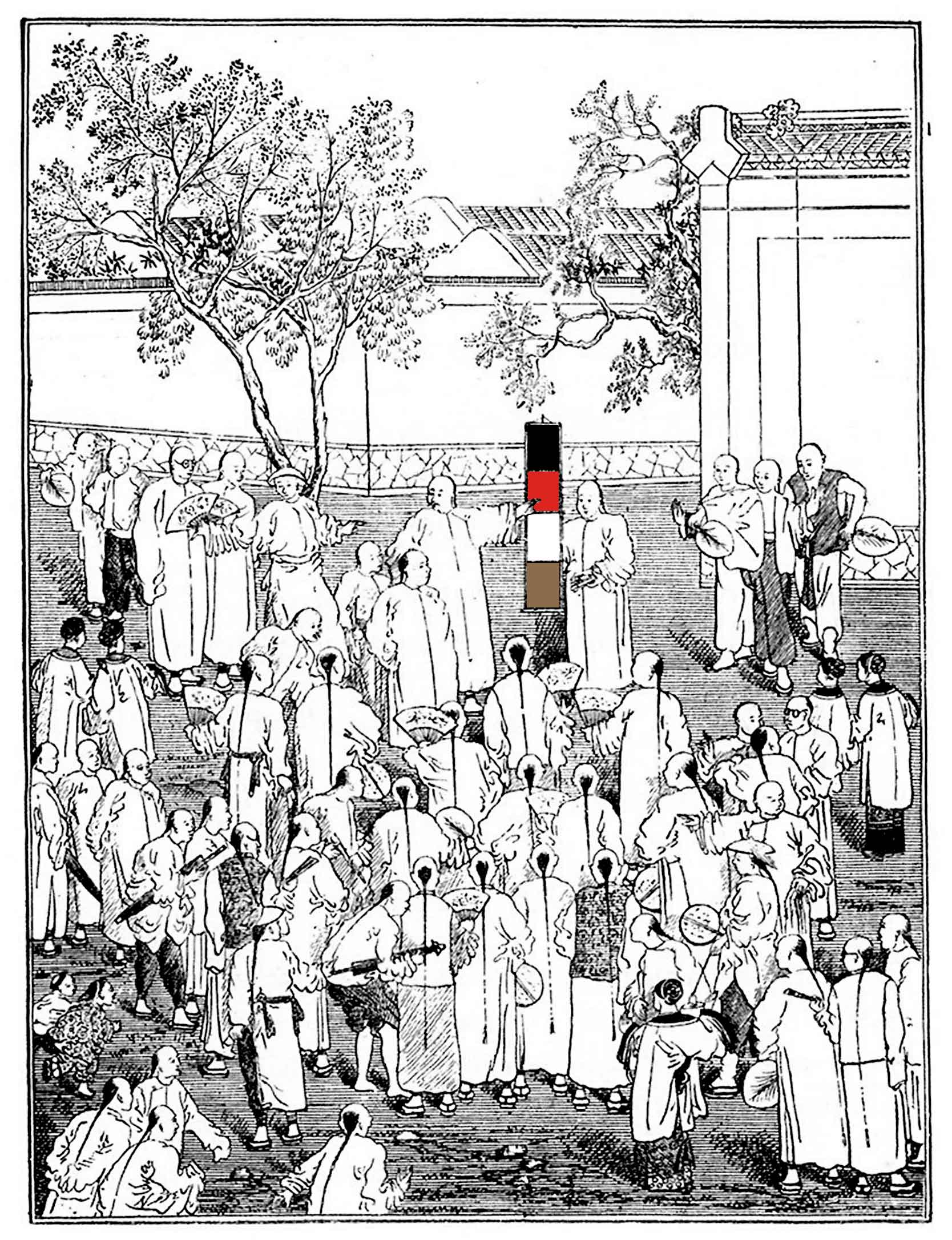
Missionary preaching in China using Moody's version of The Wordless Book

Moody and Sankey visited Britain, with Moody preaching and Sankey singing at meetings. Together, they published books of Christian hymns. In 1883, they visited Edinburgh and raised £10,000 for the building of a home for the Carrubbers Close Mission. Moody later preached at the laying of the foundation stone for what is now called the Carrubbers Christian Centre, one of the few buildings on the Royal Mile which continues to be used for its original purpose.

Moody greatly influenced the cause of cross-cultural Christian missions after he met Hudson Taylor, a pioneer missionary to China. He actively supported the China Inland Mission and encouraged many of his congregation to volunteer for service overseas.

=== International acclaim ===
His influence was felt among Swedes. Being of English heritage and never visiting a Scandinavian country, nonetheless he became a hero revivalist among Swedish Mission Friends (Missionsvänner) in Sweden and America. News of Moody's large revival campaigns in Great Britain from 1873 through 1875 traveled quickly to Sweden, making "Mr. Moody" a household name in homes of many Mission Friends. Moody's sermons published in Sweden were distributed in books, newspapers, and colporteur tracts, and they led to the spread of Sweden's "Moody fever" from 1875 through 1880.

He preached his last sermon on November 16, 1899, in Kansas City, Missouri. Becoming ill, he returned home by train to Northfield. During the preceding several months, friends had observed he had added some 30 pounds (14 kg) to his already ample frame.

=== Death ===
While no clinical diagnosis or exact cause was given, it has been assumed that he suffered from congestive heart failure. He died on December 22, 1899, surrounded by his family. Already installed as the leader of the Chicago Bible Institute, R. A. Torrey succeeded Moody as its pastor.

== Legacy ==
Religious historian James Findlay states:

Speaking before thousands in the dark business suit, bearded, rotund Dwight L. Moody seemed the epitome of the "businessman in clerical garb" who typified popular religion in late 19th-century America... Earthy, unlettered, a dynamo of energy, the revivalist was very much a man of his times... Moody adapted revivalism, one of the major institutions of evangelical Protestantism, to the urban context. ... His organizational ability, demonstrated in the great revivals he conducted in England, combined to fashion his spectacular career as the creator of modern mass revivalism.

Ten years after Moody's death, the Chicago Avenue Church was renamed the Moody Church in his honor, and the Chicago Bible Institute was likewise renamed the Moody Bible Institute. Dwight D. Eisenhower, who was born in 1890, was named after him. During World War II, the Liberty ship SS Dwight L. Moody was named in his honor.

== Works ==
- Heaven (1881). Diggory Press. ISBN 978-1-84685-812-3
- Prevailing Prayer—What Hinders It? (1884). Diggory Press. ISBN 978-1-84685-803-1
- Secret Power (1881). Diggory Press. ISBN 978-1-84685-802-4
- The Ten Commandments (1896).
- A Life for Christ—What a Normal Christian Life Looks Like (1889).
- The Way to God and How to Find It (1884).

== See also ==
- William Phillips Hall, a close friend Moody influenced to become an evangelist and lay preacher.
- Horatio Spafford, a friend of Moody's who wrote the words to the hymn It Is Well With My Soul

== Bibliography ==
- Austin, William (2007). The Wordless Book: The History of a Simple Tool. Bloomington, IN: CrossBooks.
- Chartier, Myron Raymond (1969). The Social Views of Dwight L. Moody and Their Relation to the Workingman of 1860–1900. Fort Hays Studies Series. Vol. 40. Hays, Kansas: Fort Hays State University.
- "Dwight Moody: Evangelist with a Common Touch". Christianity Today. August 8, 2008.
- "Christian Biography Resources".
- Dorsett, L. W. (1997). A Passion for Souls: The Life of D. L. Moody. Chicago: Moody Publishers.
- Findlay, J. F. (1969). Dwight L. Moody: American Evangelist 1837–1899. Chicago: University of Chicago Press.
- Gundry, S. N. (1976). Love Them In: The Proclamation Theology of D. L. Moody. Chicago: Moody Press.
- Evensen, B. J. (2003). God's Man for the Gilded Age: D. L. Moody and the Rise of Mass Evangelism. New York: Oxford University Press.
- Gloege, Timothy (2017). Guaranteed Pure: The Moody Bible Institute, Business, and the Making of Modern Evangelicalism. Chapel Hill: University of North Carolina Press.
- Gustafson, David M. (2004). "D.L. Moody and the Swedish-American Evangelical Free". Swedish-American Historical Quarterly. 55: 107–135.
- Hamilton, Michael S. (2014). "The Interdenominational Evangelicalism of D.L. Moody and the Problem of Fundamentalism". In Dochuk, Darren (ed.). American Evangelicalism: George Marsden and the State of American Religious History. Notre Dame: University of Notre Dame Press.
- Hummel, Daniel G. (2023). The Rise and Fall of Dispensationalism: How the Evangelical Battle over the End Times Shaped a Nation. Grand Rapids, MI: Eerdmans. ISBN 978-0-8028-7922-6.
- Maas, David (1990). "The Life & Times of D. L. Moody". Christian History (25).
- Moody, Paul Dwight (1900). The Shorter Life of D. L. Moody. New York: Fleming H. Revell.
- Moody, W. R. (1900). The Life of Dwight L. Moody. New York: Fleming H. Revell.
- Pollock, John (1963). Moody Without Sankey. London: Hodder & Stoughton.
