= Spencer L. Kimball =

American educator (1918–2003)

Spencer LeVan Kimball (August 26, 1918 – October 26, 2003) was an American lawyer and professor at the University of Utah, the University of Michigan Law School and the University of Chicago.

Kimball was the oldest son of Spencer W. Kimball and his wife Camilla Eyring Kimball. He was born in Thatcher, Arizona and raised in Safford, Arizona. He received his undergraduate degree from the University of Arizona and then served in the United States navy on the Admiral's staff as a Japanese interpreter during World War II.

He received his law degree from the University of Utah. He was later a Rhodes Scholar studying at Lincoln College, Oxford. He received his SJD from the University of Wisconsin-Madison. He later served on the law faculty there and was the youngest dean of law in the history of the University of Utah. He was also on the faculty of the University of Michigan Law School and the University of Chicago Law School. At the University of Chicago he was the Seymour Logan Professor of Law.

Kimball helped to establish an American Civil Liberties Union chapter in Utah.

Although he was widely associated with the LDS Church because of his father's prominent leadership positions, Kimball ceased his activity with the church while in his thirties and remained irreligious for the rest of his life. Kimball never desired to formally leave the LDS church, and took pride in his Mormon pioneer heritage and his father's position as church president, but gradually stopped believing in the divine claims of the LDS church and all other religions.
