= Martha Kimball =

American proponent of Memorial Day (1840–1894)

Martha Gertrude (Bowen) Kimball
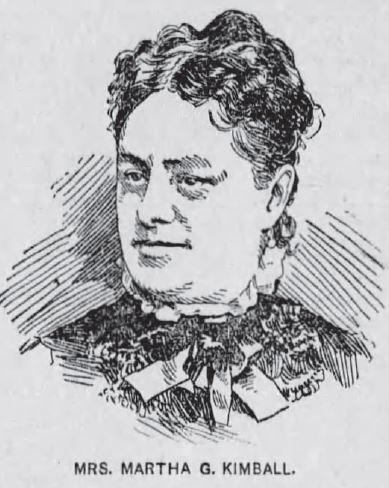
- from Philadelphia Times, June 10, 1894
- Born: November 11, 1840; Portland, Maine, U.S.
- Died: April 21, 1894 (aged 53); Philadelphia, Pennsylvania, U.S.
- Burial place: West Laurel Hill Cemetery, Bala Cynwyd, Pennsylvania, U.S.
- Spouse: Henry S. Kimball

Martha G. Kimball (November 11, 1840-April 21, 1894) was an American army nurse who played a role in the founding of Memorial Day, the United States holiday to mourn military personnel who died in the line of duty. She served as a Union army nurse during the American Civil War. Her letter to John A. Logan, commander-in-chief of the Grand Army of the Republic, with her observations of southern women decorating Confederate States Army soldier's graves, is recognized as one of the reasons he issued General Order #11 designating May 30th for decorating Union soldier graves.

== Early life and the Civil War ==
Martha Gertrude Bowen was born November 11,1840, in Portland, Maine, to John and Mary Bowen. She married Henry S. Kimball the son of Josiah Kimball and Mary Spofford in Boston in 1859. She accompanied her husband as he inspected confiscated cotton during the American Civil War. She worked as a nurse during William Tecumseh Sherman's military campaign in Georgia and was appointed chief inspector of hospitals.

== Memorial Day recognition ==
In 1867, Kimball visited the southern United States and wrote a letter to John A. Logan, the commander-in-chief of the Grand Army of the Republic organization, of her observations of "southern women decorating the graves of their dead, fallen in battle". She also recommended that Logan "should have our heroic soldiers whose lonely graves are, many unmarked, remembered in the same beautiful way."

Kimball became famous in 1889 through a letter written by Junius Simons to the New York Tribune wherein he credited her with suggesting the founding of the Memorial Day holiday. He claimed to have been acting as General John A. Logan’s private secretary when Mrs. Kimball wrote Logan a letter suggesting the Memorial Day holiday. Logan instituted the holiday on May 30, 1868, through the Grand Army of the Republic with General Order #11, which designated May 30th “for the purpose of strewing with flowers or otherwise decorating the graves of comrades who died in defense of their country during the late rebellion.”

In early 1890, Mary Simmerson Cunningham Logan, the widow of General John A. Logan, wrote her own letter to the National Tribune in Washington, D.C., to dispute the assertions made by Simons. Mrs. Logan claimed that while Simons had performed a few tasks for her husband, he was never Logan's personal secretary. Mrs. Logan tells her own story of traveling through the South in early 1868, seeing their decorations and relaying the information to her husband upon her return home.

Regardless, newspapers repeated Mrs. Kimball's story frequently in the years after the story broke. In 1898, the Journal of Education even included a lesson plan around her version of events. However, Mrs. Logan continued to publish her own version in books and articles.

In their book, The Genesis of the Memorial Day Holiday in America, Bellware and Gardiner dispute both stories. They point out that Logan spoke about the Southern observances of Memorial Day in his 4 July speech in Salem, Illinois in 1866. He did not need anyone to tell him about the Southern decorations in 1868 as he knew about them from the beginning, two years earlier. Mary Ann Williams and the Ladies Memorial Association of Columbus, Georgia are credited as the true originators of the holiday.

Kimball died on April 21, 1894, and was interred at West Laurel Hill Cemetery in Bala Cynwyd, Pennsylvania. The men of the GAR in Philadelphia buried her with military honors. June 9th was proclaimed “Kimball Day” in her honor. Her story was transmitted across the country as evidenced by stories that appeared later in the Topeka State Journal and the Indianapolis Journal
