= Walter Browne Woodson =

American Navy attorney and admiral

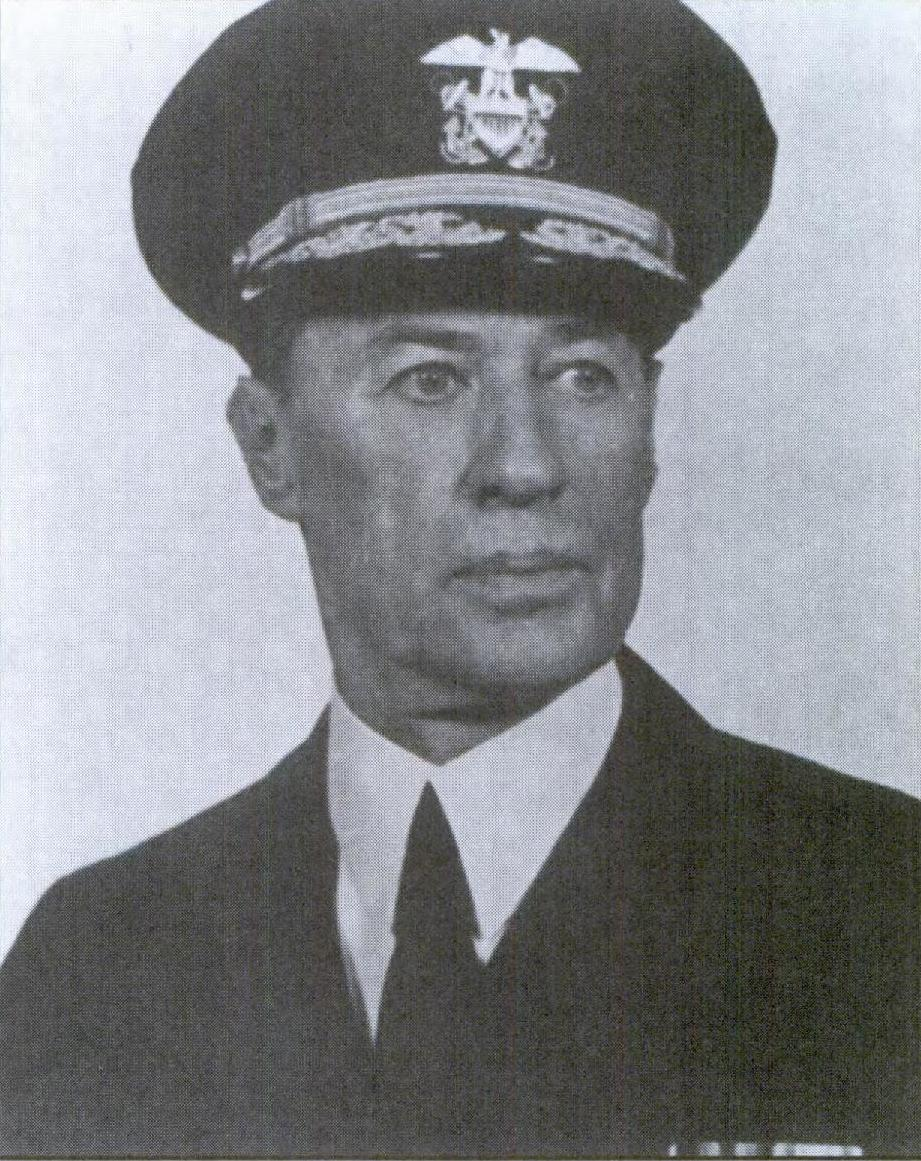
- Rear Admiral Walter Browne Woodson, USN, Judge Advocate General of the Navy
- Born: October 18, 1881; Lynchburg, Virginia, US
- Died: April 23, 1948 (aged 66); Coronado, California, US
- Burial place: Fort Rosecrans National Cemetery, San Diego, California
- Military career
- Allegiance: United States of America
- Branch: United States Navy
- Service years: 1901–1943
- Rank: Rear Admiral
- Commands: Third Division, Battleship Squadron, U.S. Atlantic Fleet; Sixth Division, Protected Cruisers, U.S. Atlantic Fleet; Battleships and Battleship Force, U.S. Atlantic Fleet; Chief of Staff, Asiatic Squadron; USS Houston; Assistant to the Judge Advocate General of the Navy; Judge Advocate General of the Navy

Rear Admiral Walter Browne Woodson, U.S. Navy (Ret.) (1881–1948), was Judge Advocate General of the Navy under President Franklin Delano Roosevelt, serving from 1938 to 1943.

== Background ==
Woodson was born in Lynchburg, Virginia, 18 October 1881. He graduated from the U.S. Naval Academy in 1901, a classmate of Admiral Chester Nimitz. He was married to Ruth Halford Woodson (5 December 1882 - 19 May 1947). He had two sons, Commander Walter Browne Woodson Jr., U.S. Navy, and Commander Halford Woodson, U.S. Navy, (11 February 1921 - 9 April 1999), and a daughter, Ruth Halford Woodson.

== Service ==
Dates of Rank: Ensign - 31 Jan 1907; Lieutenant - 31 Jan 1910; Lieutenant Commander - 29 Aug 1916; Commander - 3 June 1921; Captain - 7 Sept 1927; Rear Admiral - 20 June 1938; Naval Aide to the President from 7 Sept 1937 to 20 June 1938. Commissioned Judge Advocate General with rank of Rear Admiral, from 20 June 1938.

Woodson was the first Judge Advocate General of the Navy to hold a law degree. All subsequent Judge Advocate Generals of the Navy have held them.

Woodson "graduated with distinction from George Washington University Law School in 1914 while assigned to duty in the Office of the Judge Advocate General."

Woodson served as flag secretary to Admiral DeWitt Coffman, U.S. Atlantic Fleet, Third Division, Battleship Squadron, 1913–1916, then as commanding officer of the 6th Division, 1916, and commanding officer, Battleships and Battleship Force, 1917.

He served as Assistant to the Judge Advocate General of the Navy in 1921, and again from 1931 to 1934.

"Adm. Woodson’s last active billet was judge advocate general, which followed duty as aide to the late President Roosevelt. He had been assistant to the judge advocate general, had served as chief of staff of the Asiatic Squadron and commanded the Houston, at the time it carried President Roosevelt to Hawaii."

Woodson served as Judge Advocate General of the Navy from 1938 to 1943, retiring for physical disability. He and his wife relocated to Coronado, California, after his retirement. His health continued to fail until his death in 1948.

He was a member of the Military Order of World War, and of the United States Naval Academy Graduates Association.

== Death ==
He died Friday evening, 23 April 1948, at his home, 536 A Avenue, Coronado, California, at age 66 after a short illness. Military funeral services were conducted at the Naval Air Station Chapel, NAS North Island. Private interment took place at Fort Rosecrans National Cemetery, Chaplain John W. Weise, USN, officiating.

Woodson was survived by two sons, a daughter, four brothers, two sisters, and two grandchildren. His wife had predeceased him. His grandson, Walter Browne Woodson, III, also pursued a career in the U.S. Navy.
