= Spencer W. Kimball =

President of the LDS Church (1895–1985)

- Kimball in 1976

12th President of the Church of Jesus Christ of Latter-day Saints
- December 30, 1973 – November 5, 1985
- Predecessor: Harold B. Lee
- Successor: Ezra Taft Benson

President of the Quorum of the Twelve Apostles
- July 7, 1972 – December 30, 1973
- Predecessor: Harold B. Lee
- Successor: Ezra Taft Benson
- End reason: Became President of the Church

Acting President of the Quorum of the Twelve Apostles
- January 23, 1970 – July 2, 1972
- Reason: Harold B. Lee was serving as First Counselor in the First Presidency to Joseph Fielding Smith
- End reason: Became President of the Quorum of the Twelve Apostles

Quorum of the Twelve Apostles
- October 7, 1943 – December 30, 1973
- Called by: Heber J. Grant
- End reason: Became President of the Church

LDS Church Apostle
- October 7, 1943 – November 5, 1985
- Called by: Heber J. Grant
- Reason: Deaths of Sylvester Q. Cannon and Rudger Clawson
- Reorganization at end of term: Joseph B. Wirthlin ordained

Personal details
- Born: Spencer Woolley Kimball; March 28, 1895; Salt Lake City, Utah Territory
- Died: November 5, 1985 (aged 90); Salt Lake City, Utah, U.S.
- Resting place: Salt Lake City Cemetery; 40°46′37.9″N 111°51′28.8″W
- Education: Gila Junior College
- Spouse(s): Camilla Eyring (m. 1918)
- Children: 4
- Signature
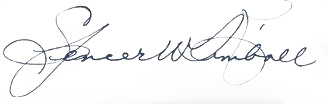

Spencer Woolley Kimball (March 28, 1895 – November 5, 1985) was an American religious leader who was the twelfth president of the Church of Jesus Christ of Latter-day Saints (LDS Church).

The grandson of early Latter-day Saint apostle Heber C. Kimball, Kimball was born in Salt Lake City, Utah Territory. He spent most of his early life in Thatcher, Arizona, where his father, Andrew Kimball, farmed and served as the area's stake president. He served an LDS mission in Independence, Missouri, from 1914 to 1916, then worked for various banks in Arizona's Gila Valley as a clerk and bank teller. Kimball later co-founded a business selling bonds and insurance that, after weathering the Great Depression, became highly successful. Kimball served as a stake president in his hometown from 1938 until 1943, when he was called as a member of the Quorum of the Twelve Apostles.

Like most other LDS Church apostles, Kimball traveled extensively to fulfill a wide variety of administrative and ecclesiastical duties. Early in his time as an apostle, Kimball was directed by church president George Albert Smith to spend extra time in religious and humanitarian work with Native Americans, which Kimball did throughout his life. He initiated the Indian Placement Program, which helped many Native American students gain education in the 1960s and 1970s while they stayed with LDS foster families.

In late 1973, following the sudden death of Harold B. Lee, Kimball became the LDS Church's twelfth president, a position he held until his death in 1985. Kimball's presidency was noted for the 1978 announcement ending the restriction on church members of black African descent being ordained to the priesthood or receiving temple ordinances. Kimball's presidency saw large growth in the LDS Church, both in terms of membership and the number of temples. Kimball was the first church president to state publicly that the church expects all able-bodied male members to serve missions in young adulthood, resulting in an increase in missionary service.

== Ancestry ==
Kimball's paternal grandfather, Heber C. Kimball, was one of the original LDS apostles who were called when Joseph Smith first organized the Quorum of the Twelve in February 1835. Kimball later served as first counselor to Brigham Young in the church's First Presidency from 1847 until his death in 1868.

Kimball's maternal grandfather, Edwin D. Woolley, was a prominent LDS bishop in Salt Lake City for many years.

== Early life (1895–1916) ==
Spencer Woolley Kimball was born on March 28, 1895, in Salt Lake City, Utah Territory, to Andrew Kimball and Olive Woolley. He had ten siblings. In 1898, when Kimball was three years old, his father was called as president of the St. Joseph Arizona Stake, and his family relocated to the town of Thatcher, in Southeastern Arizona's Graham County.

During his childhood, Kimball had a number of medical problems, including typhoid fever and facial paralysis (likely Bell's palsy), and he once nearly drowned. Four of his sisters died in childhood, and his mother died when he was eleven. Though only 5 feet 6 inches (1.68 metres) tall as an adult, Kimball was an avid basketball player, and he was the star and leading scorer on most of his school and recreational teams. In addition to being an athlete, Kimball was an honor student at the LDS Gila Academy (modern Eastern Arizona College). During summer holidays, he often worked at a dairy in Globe, Arizona, milking cows, cleaning stalls, and washing bottles for $50 to $60 per month as well as room and board.

Kimball graduated from high school in May 1914 and, one week later, was called to serve as a missionary in the Swiss–German Mission. Less than two months later, his European mission call was cut short by the assassination of Archduke Ferdinand and the subsequent outbreak of World War I. Kimball was reassigned to the Central States Mission and spent most of the rest of his mission in the towns and rural settlements of Missouri until 1916.

== Marriage and early career (1917–1925) ==
Camilla Eyring
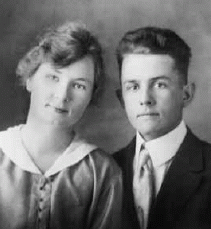
- Newlyweds Spencer Kimball and Camilla Eyring (1917)
- Born: Camilla Eyring; December 7, 1894; Colonia Juárez, Chihuahua, Mexico
- Died: September 20, 1987 (aged 92); Salt Lake City, Utah
- Spouse: Spencer W. Kimball (m. 1918; died 1985)
- Parent(s): Edward Christian (father); Caroline Cottam Romney (mother)

Hoping to become a schoolteacher, Kimball spent one semester at the University of Arizona in the spring of 1917, but he received an army draft notice later that year. During that time, he courted Camilla Eyring (1894–1987), a schoolteacher at Gila Academy, where Kimball had attended high school. They began dating in August 1917 and exchanged letters regularly after Kimball left for a semester at Brigham Young University (BYU) the next month. After one month at BYU, Kimball was notified that his call into the army was imminent, and he had to leave the university and return to his hometown. He returned to Arizona, but his army group was never called for duty before World War I ended with the signing of the Armistice of 11 November 1918.

Kimball and Eyring's relationship deepened quickly, and by late October, they had decided to marry. Because of their employment commitments and lack of money, the couple could not afford to travel to Utah to marry in the nearest LDS temple. They were married in a civil ceremony in Camilla's home in Pima, Arizona, on November 16, 1917. Seven months later, the couple made the two-day journey by train to Salt Lake City where they were sealed in the Salt Lake Temple on June 7, 1918. They eventually had four children: Spencer L. "Spence" (1918–2003), Olive Beth "Bobby" (1922–2018), Andrew E. (1927–2020), and Edward L. "Ed" (1930–2016).

In 1921, Kimball began work at the Thatcher branch of the Arizona Trust and Savings Bank, where he was eventually promoted to assistant cashier at $225 per month, a high salary at the time. The bank failed in 1923 in the aftermath of the Depression of 1920–21; Kimball lost his $3000 investments in bank stock and was forced to take a lower-paying job at another bank. Kimball also performed a variety of other local jobs to earn extra income to support his wife and children, including playing the piano and singing at local events, stringing with Camilla for local newspapers, distributing for an herbal laxative company, and clerical work for local stores.

Shortly after Kimball married, his father called him to serve as clerk for the St. Joseph Stake. In the 1920s, local stake clerks still performed the extensive record-keeping and reporting duties that are now digitized and done centrally at the LDS Church's headquarters in Salt Lake City. The position of stake clerk was essentially a part-time job, and those called were paid a monthly salary of $50.

== Career and stake presidency (1925–1943) ==
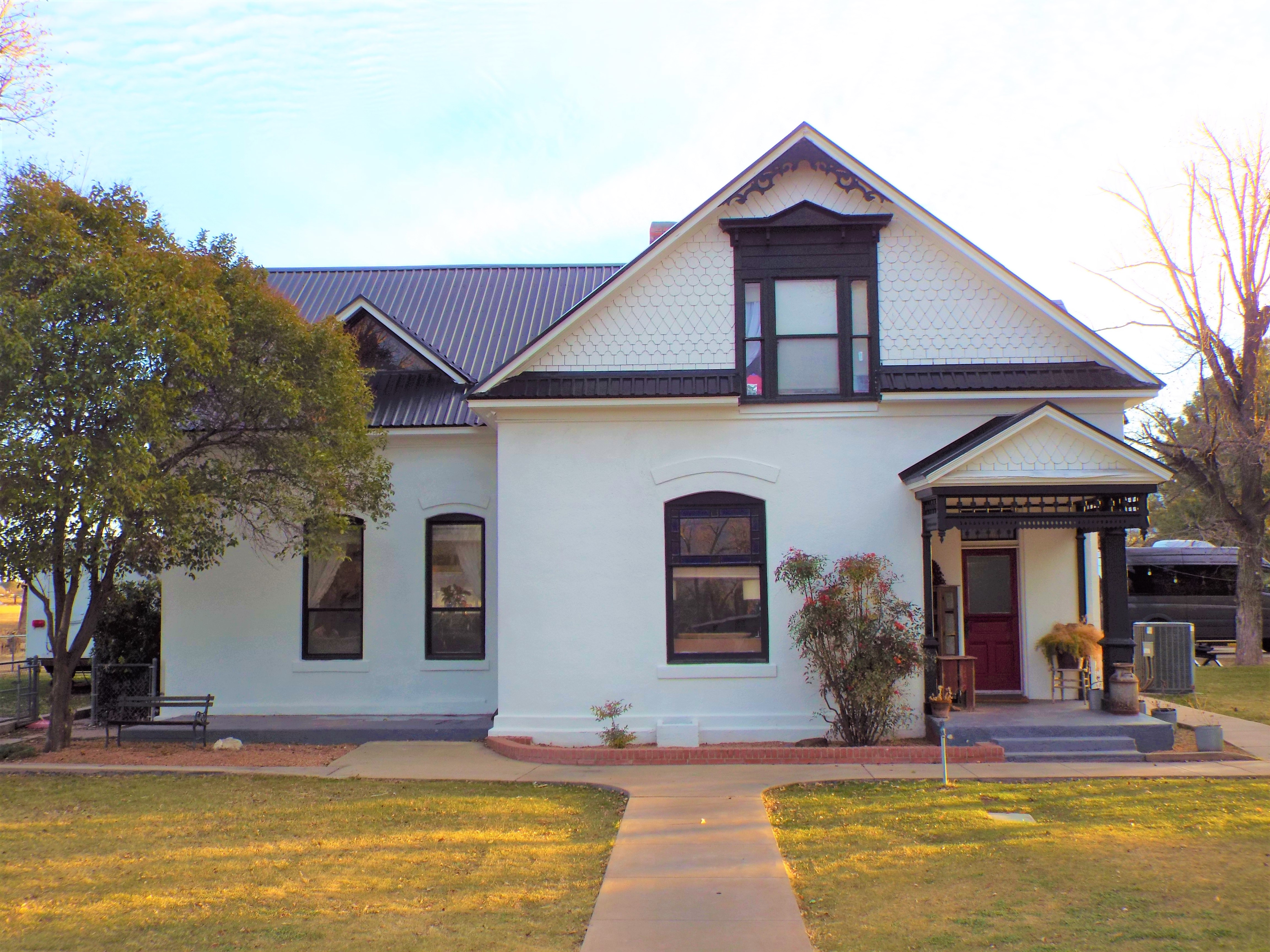
Spencer W. Kimball Childhood Home in Thatcher, Arizona

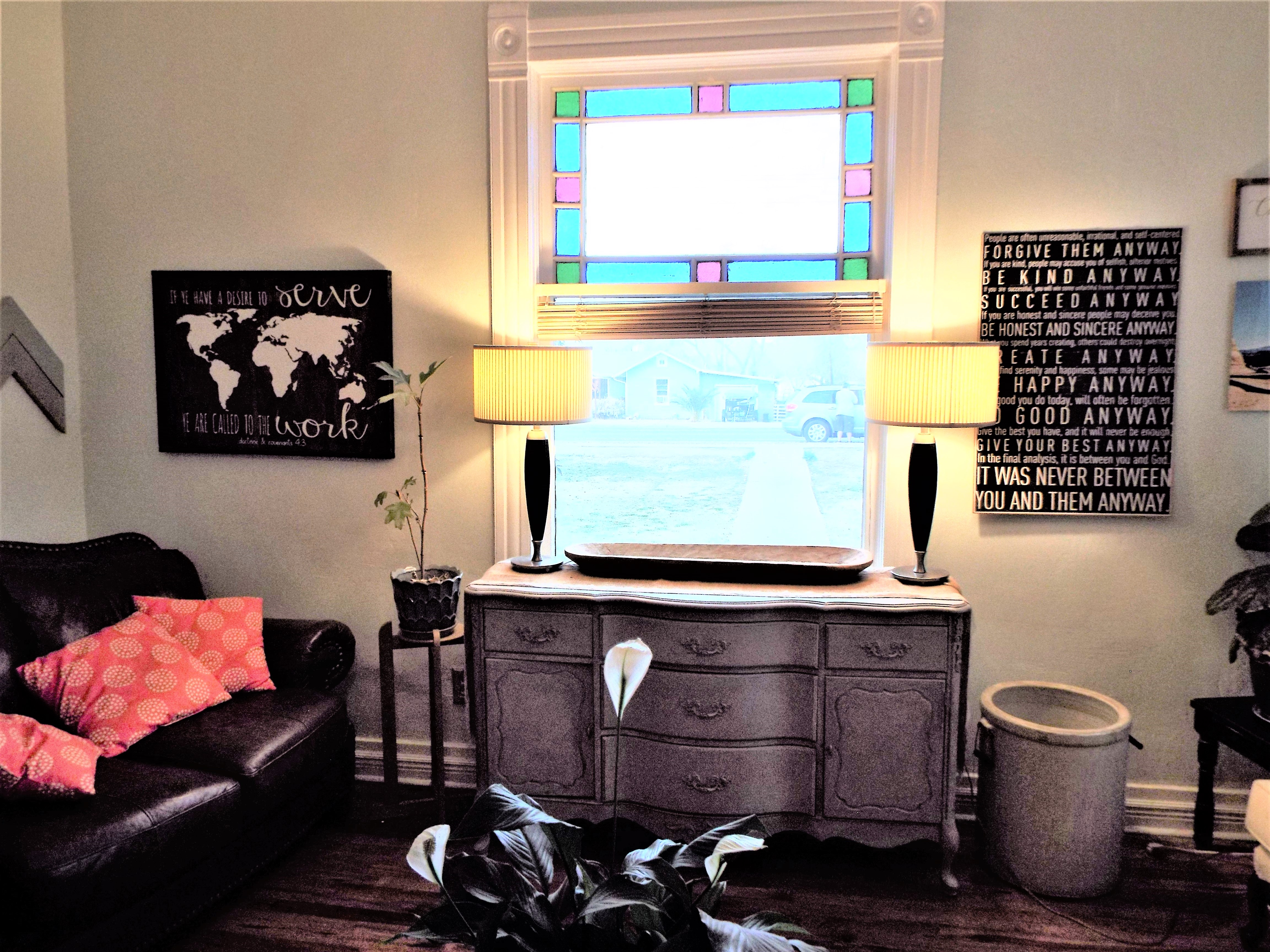
Inside the Spencer W. Kimball Childhood Home

In 1925, Kimball and Joseph W. Greenhalgh, a Latter-day Saint businessman who served as a bishop in a local ward, began a small securities business making and purchasing loans from local businesses and individuals. By 1927, the business became independent, and after investing $150 of his own money in the business, Kimball began running it full-time in Safford, Arizona, as the Kimball–Greenhalgh Agency, dealing in local insurance, real estate, debt collection, and bonds. The business suffered greatly during the Great Depression and lost much of its capital between 1930 and 1933. Through continued work and re-investment of profits, it survived the Great Depression and became increasingly successful during the late 1930s and early 1940s. By 1943, Kimball's initial $150 investment in the agency was worth nearly $100,000.

Kimball was active in many civic organizations, including the Parent-Teacher Association, city council, Red Cross, Boy Scouts, and he was elected leader of the Arizona Rotary Club in 1936. Kimball had achieved record success in organizing new Rotary Club chapters, and the Arizona membership voted to pay for him and his wife to travel to the club's 1936 international convention in Nice, France. They went by train to Chicago and then to Montreal, where their oldest son, Spencer L., was serving as an LDS missionary. They traveled on a week-long passage on an ocean liner to Le Havre. From there, they visited Paris, Monte Carlo, Genoa, Rome, Pompeii, Florence, Venice, Vienna, the Swiss Alps, Belgium, the Netherlands, and London.

In February 1938, LDS apostle Melvin J. Ballard was sent to Thatcher to divide the growing St. Joseph Stake. The newly created Mount Graham Stake covered the eastern half of the old stake, and Kimball was called as its first stake president. Though smaller than the previous stake, the newly formed stake covered a large area that extended east as far as El Paso, Texas. For Kimball and his two counselors to visit each ward in the stake required traveling a total of 1,750 miles (2,820 km). During the Mount Graham Stake's semiannual stake conference in September 1941, unusually heavy rains caused the Gila River to overflow its banks, flooding several of the towns in the stake and causing $100,000 in damage to the farms and buildings of Latter-day Saints in the area. As stake president, Kimball coordinated the LDS Church's humanitarian response, which quickly mobilized funds, materials, and manpower to care for displaced residents and begin recovery.

Following the Japanese attack on Pearl Harbor on December 7, 1941, and the subsequent entry of the United States into World War II, a number of young men from the stake left to join the US military. At one point, 250 men from the stake served in the war, and Kimball ensured that every one received a copy of the monthly stake bulletin and often wrote personal notes on each copy to the recipient.

Kimball was widely known and respected in the community, and he was constantly stopped on the streets of Safford by acquaintances and friends asking for his advice. After he was called to serve as stake president, non-Mormon residents and travelers in Safford often asked Kimball to perform marriages for them. Kimball's demanding schedule of managing the Kimball–Greenhalgh Agency, serving in civic organizations, and serving in LDS Church leadership positions as well as making time for his wife and children took mental and physical tolls on his body. His journals from the 1930s and early 1940s often mention his exhaustion from days that were spent working 16 hours or more: "Am on a tension from 7 a.m. till 11 p.m. every single minute every day. I know I'm working too hard but there seems no place to stop."

== Apostolic ministry (1943–1973) ==
=== Calling ===
The deaths of Sylvester Q. Cannon and Rudger Clawson created two vacancies in the LDS Church's Quorum of the Twelve Apostles in mid-1943. On July 8, 1943, Kimball received a telephone call from J. Reuben Clark, the first counselor to church president Heber J. Grant, notifying him that he had been called to fill one of the vacancies. Kimball was initially so shocked by the call that he asked Clark's permission to ponder it for several days before he went to Salt Lake City to meet with him in person, as part of a previously scheduled family trip. After the phone call, Kimball's desire to accept the calling was overwhelmed by feelings of self-doubt and incompetence. His wife, Camilla, recounted that although her husband was not prone to tears, he afterward lay on the floor of their home and wept uncontrollably as she tried to comfort him. After an intense emotional and spiritual struggle, Kimball had an unusual dream, which gave him peace on his ability to accept the calling. He was ordained an apostle by Grant and added to the Quorum of the Twelve Apostles in the Salt Lake Temple on October 7, 1943. Grant had chosen Ezra Taft Benson to fill the other vacancy in the Quorum, and he and Kimball were ordained on the same day. As he was four years older than Benson, Kimball was ordained first, which put him ahead of Benson in the Quorum's seniority.

In accordance with church requirements and tradition, the Kimballs immediately began the transition from Arizona to Salt Lake City upon Kimball's call to be an apostle. Kimball sold his share in the Kimball–Greenhalgh Agency for $65,000 and sold their home and all their other property in Arizona. Kimball was particularly saddened to leave his local Rotary Club chapter and his other professional associations; Camilla worried about leaving her elderly parents in Arizona and relocating their second son, Andrew, who had just been elected senior class president at Safford High School.

=== World War II ===
Kimball's first years as an apostle were dominated by World War II. Kimball often encouraged American church members to purchase war bonds to support the war effort, which they would then be able to cash out after the war and use the accumulated interest to send returned soldiers on LDS missions. Kimball lamented the global destruction of World War II and once wrote in his journal, "How outraged the Lord must feel to see His children fighting down here like wild beasts." As the keynote speaker at BYU's 1944 baccalaureate service, Kimball publicly criticized members of Allied nations for concentrating on "the tyranny and shackles of [other] nations and at the same time [remaining] in bondage individually to sin."

As World War II neared its conclusion, Kimball and other LDS Church leaders constantly responded to the needs of the friends and families of LDS war casualties. Kimball's eldest son, Spence, was nearly killed in 1945 while serving aboard the aircraft carrier USS Franklin, when bombs dropped from Japanese airplanes damaged the ship and ignited its tanks of aviation fuel. In an attempt to give comfort to families of those killed in combat, Kimball drafted a well-known letter in which he wrote that sin, not premature death, was the only true tragedy in life. Kimball compared the death of young servicemen to the early death of Jesus Christ and stated that although such death is heartbreaking, from an eternal perspective, God's all-knowing purposes would be seen in their circumstances.

=== Native Americans ===
In May 1945, shortly after becoming church president, George Albert Smith instructed Kimball, "I want you to look after the Indians—they are neglected. Take charge and watch after the Indians in all the world." Kimball saw the assignment as fulfillment of a prophecy given in the patriarchal blessing he received as an eight-year-old in 1903, which had stated that Kimball would "preach the Gospel to many people, but more especially to the Lamanites." That term refers to a people in the Book of Mormon believed by Latter-day Saints to be among the ancestors of modern Native Americans; another term was Nephites. In September 1946, George Albert Smith again gave Kimball the charge to watch over the interests of the indigenous people of the Americas. At this time Smith explicitly included the indigenous peoples of the Pacific islands.

In October 1946, Kimball and several other general authorities toured the Navajo Nation in an effort to improve relations between the LDS Church and the Navajo people. Kimball was dismayed at the abject poverty among the Navajo and empathized with their distrust of the US government. At that time, the average Navajo person ate no more than 1,200 calories (5,000 kJ) a day, and a single dentist served the entire population of 55,000. Though the reservation of the Navajo Nation covered 175,000,000 acres (710,000 km^{2}), only 0.01% of that area was arable. In 1947, Golden Buchanan, an LDS leader in Sevier County, Utah, heard of a 17-year-old Navajo girl working on a sugar beet farm who wanted to stay in Utah and attend public school. Buchanan wrote Kimball with an idea for the children of Navajo families to live with local LDS families so that they could receive proper nutrition and educations. Kimball supported the idea and asked Buchanan if his family would be willing to take Helen John, the Navajo girl, as a foster daughter to begin the program. Buchanan's family agreed. While it took time to develop the program, that is referred to as the start of the LDS Church's Indian Placement Program, also known as the "Lamanites Placement Program". By 1954, the program had 68 students, and the church had standardized some of its approach. By 1969, nearly 5,000 students were placed with LDS families throughout the Western United States and Canada.

Kimball was particularly distressed by the racism against Native Americans that was still widespread among white church members in the 1940s and 1950s. At the LDS Church's April 1954 general conference, Kimball openly denounced the prevalent prejudices against non-whites and compared such church members to the Pharisees who mistreated Jesus Christ and the priest and Levite from the parable of the Good Samaritan. Kimball subsequently repeated his warning at a BYU campus devotional, stating that there were "too many Pharisees among the white [students and faculty]... too many Levites who pull their robes about them and pass by with disdain."

=== Individual counseling ===
When not touring missions or presiding over weekend stake conferences, Kimball spent weekdays answering correspondences at his home or working in his office at LDS Church headquarters in Salt Lake City. Kimball was noted among the apostles for his willingness to meet with church members struggling with serious personal problems, particularly married couples considering divorce or individuals wishing to confess serious violations of the LDS Church's law of chastity, which prohibits sexual relations outside of marriage. During his time as an apostle, Kimball met with thousands of church members and full-time missionaries who, for various reasons, felt their own local church leaders could not help them. Kimball "had no patience for sin [but] almost infinite patience for sinners" and often spent long hours with individuals in great distress. In 1959, Kimball and fellow apostle Mark E. Petersen were assigned to counsel church members dealing with homosexuality, which Kimball believed could, "like all other problems", be overcome through "consistent prayerful exercise of self-restraint". Kimball's experiences impelled his writing of The Miracle of Forgiveness, first published in 1969, which dealt with the serious nature of LDS standards on sexual morality and counseled church members on repentance and avoidance of such problems.

=== Health challenges ===
Beginning in 1932, Kimball suffered from boils and infectious sores, which plagued him until the advent of antibacterial medicines such as sulfonamides and penicillin during World War II.

In May 1948, while he was holding church meetings throughout Navajo and Apache communities in Arizona, Kimball suffered severe chest pain from a heart attack, after he had spent an afternoon struggling to lift an automobile out of deep sand. Kimball was physically sluggish throughout the rest of the trip, and after he had returned to Salt Lake City and undergone an electrocardiogram, his physician prescribed one month of rest from his church duties. Kimball was only 53 and had considered himself to be generally healthy and fit; he persuaded his physician not to tell the other apostles or the First Presidency. However, on his next assignment in Rigby, Idaho, Kimball again experienced chest pains, which escalated into another heart attack several days after his return. During the early episodes, Kimball passed the time by discussing his wishes regarding the family's finances and investments with his wife in case he did not survive the infarctions. After receiving a priesthood blessing from church president George Albert Smith, Kimball spent two months on bed rest followed by two weeks resting at the Navajo Nation. At his physician's urging, he spent several additional weeks recuperating with his wife near the seashore in Long Beach, California. A cardiologist that Kimball consulted in California believed that his heart had been weakened by an undiagnosed case of rheumatic fever during childhood and instructed Kimball to avoid overwork and gaining unnecessary weight. Kimball's chest pains recurred occasionally throughout the next several years, particularly in times of greatest stress or fatigue.

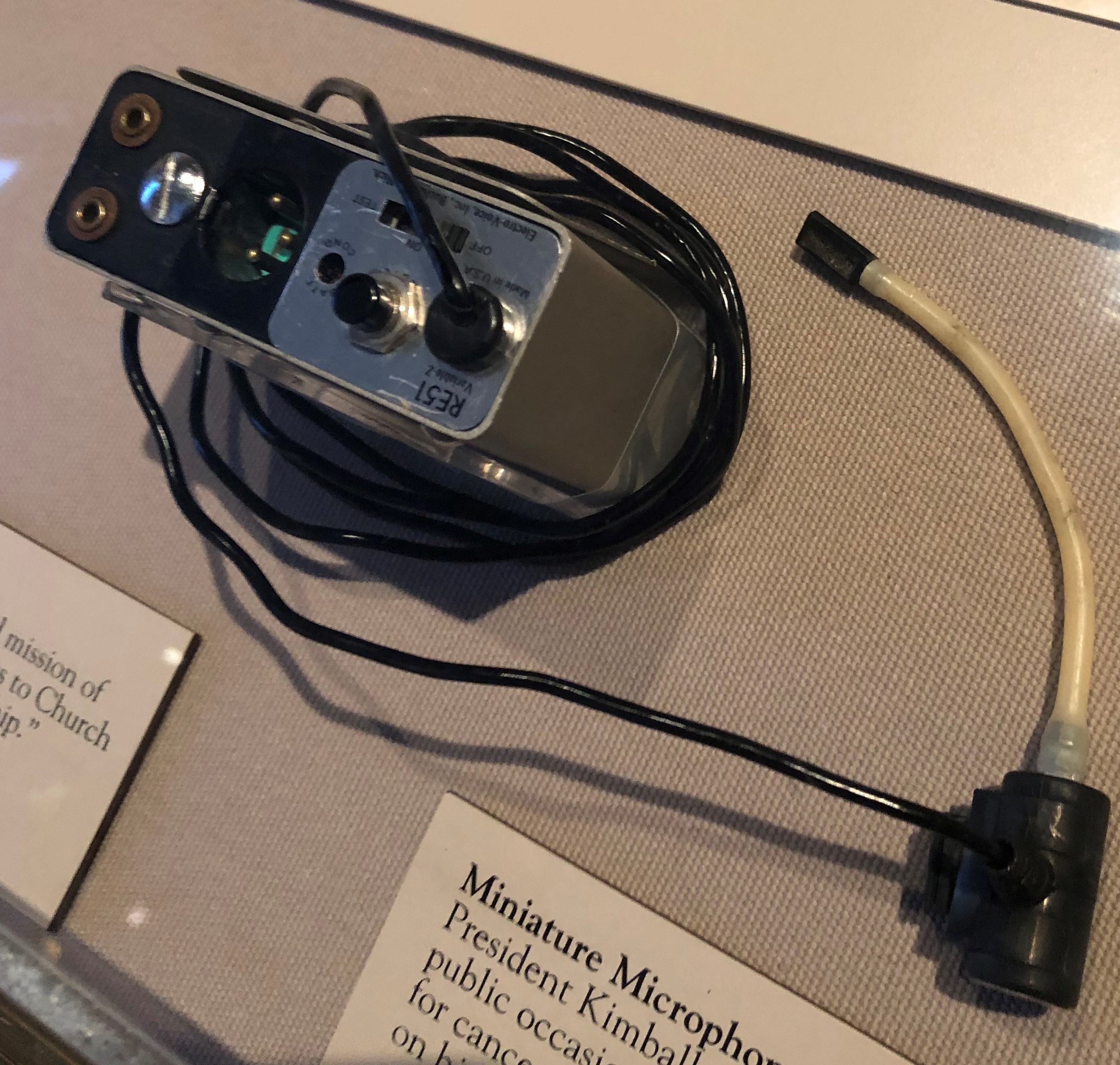
Ear-mounted microphone used by Kimball to magnify his voice

In early 1950, when he was 55, Kimball, who had never smoked or used tobacco, began experiencing persistent hoarseness and after a physical examination, he underwent a biopsy of a white spot in his throat. The biopsy caused some brief voice impairment and indicated that Kimball had a throat infection but not cancer. In late 1956, Kimball's hoarseness returned, coupled with occasional bleeding in the back of his throat. Kimball's physician sent him to New York City to meet with Dr. Hayes Martin (1892–1977), an expert on cancers of the head and neck. Martin performed another biopsy, which indicated "borderline malignancy", and in early 1957, Martin recommended immediate surgery. Kimball had neglected to seek approval from church president David O. McKay regarding his 1957 biopsy. At the time, the biopsy itself could cause permanent vocal damage. He felt that as an apostle, he should have sought McKay's approval before he underwent surgical procedures that could render him incapable of fulfilling apostolic duties.

McKay stated that he believed Kimball could still serve as an apostle even if he underwent a complete laryngectomy and advised him to go forward with the procedure. Martin subsequently surgically removed one of Kimball's vocal cords and half of the other, leaving him barely able to speak above a hoarse whisper. After several weeks of enforced silence, Kimball slowly recovered, and by November 1957, his physician allowed him to resume speaking in public. Kimball's voice remained raspy throughout the rest of his life, and he usually wore an ear-mounted microphone to help magnify his voice, even when he was speaking at normal microphone-equipped pulpits.

In early 1972, when he was 77, Kimball began experiencing difficulty breathing, excessive fatigue, and sleeplessness. Medical examinations discovered serious aortic calcification and some coronary artery disease. Meanwhile, Kimball had experienced a recurrence of his earlier throat cancer. He arranged a meeting between his physicians, cardiologist Ernest L. Wilkinson and cardiothoracic surgeon Russell M. Nelson (a future LDS Church president), and the church's First Presidency. Nelson later described the meeting:

President Kimball breathlessly began, "I am a dying man. I can feel my life slipping. At the present rate of deterioration I believe that I can live only about two more months. Now I would like my doctor to present his views." Dr. Wilkinson then reaffirmed President Kimball’s feelings, concluding that recovery would be unlikely and death would ensue in the not-too-distant future. Then President Kimball called on me as a cardiac surgeon and asked, "What can surgery offer?" I indicated that an operation, if it were to be done, would consist of two components. First, an aortic valve replacement would be required. Second, an important coronary artery with a blockage should be treated with a bypass graft. President Harold B. Lee of the First Presidency then asked the crucial question, "What would be the risks with such a procedure?" "I don't know," I replied. "In a man aged seventy-seven, the risk of either of these operations is significant. But to do both on one whose heart is failing would entail risk so high that the operation cannot be recommended as a safe one." As a weary President Kimball responded, "I am an old man and ready to die," President Lee interrupted. He rose to his feet, pounded his fist to the desk, and said, with his prophetic power, "Spencer, you have been called! You are not to die! You are to do everything you need to do to care for yourself and continue to live." President Kimball replied, "Then I will have the operation."

— Russell M. Nelson, speaking at Kimball's funeral (November 1985)

Kimball's heart surgery was postponed for him to undergo radiation therapy on his throat, which was successful. Immediately following the conclusion of the LDS Church's April 1972 general conference, Kimball successfully underwent a 4.5 hour open-heart surgery that was performed by Nelson. Kimball spent the next several months recovering.

== Church presidency (1973–1985) ==
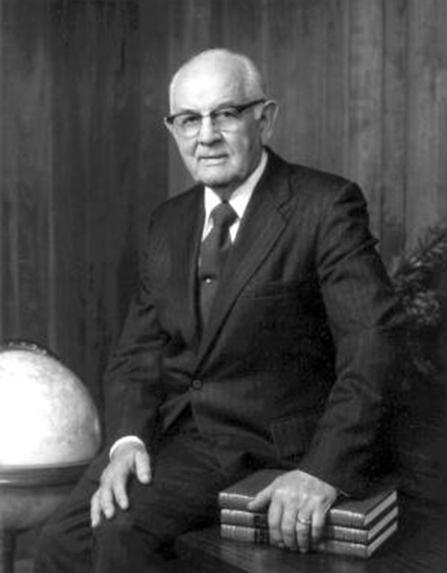
Kimball as church president

Given Kimball's history of health problems, many people—including Kimball himself—did not anticipate him living long enough to become president of the LDS Church. However, on December 26, 1973, Harold B. Lee, who was four years younger than Kimball and had previously been in much better health, unexpectedly died, leaving Kimball as the most senior apostle and thus the presumptive new church president. Kimball was ordained church president on December 30, 1973, the day after Lee's funeral, choosing N. Eldon Tanner and Marion G. Romney as his first and second counselors. LDS apostle Boyd K. Packer recalled shortly afterward discovering Kimball sitting alone in the church president's office quietly weeping, and Kimball saying to him: "I am such a little man for such a big responsibility!"

Kimball traveled more than any previous church president, visiting a total of 85 countries worldwide. His other contributions included announcing 27 temples, dedicating four, establishing satellite communication in church buildings, and decreasing the duration of church services to three hours.

=== Missionary work ===
Kimball was the earliest church president to state clearly that all able-bodied LDS young men should serve a full-time mission. When Kimball became president in 1974, the church had 17,000 full-time missionaries, and within several years, it had 25,000. Additionally, under Kimball's leadership, the number of missionaries in North America increased from 2,000 to 7,000. Between 1976 and 1978, the church built and dedicated its Missionary Training Center in Provo, Utah, 1 mile (1.6 km) north of BYU, where new missionaries go to receive training in scripture, teaching methods, and, if necessary, a new language.

=== 1978 revelation on priesthood ===
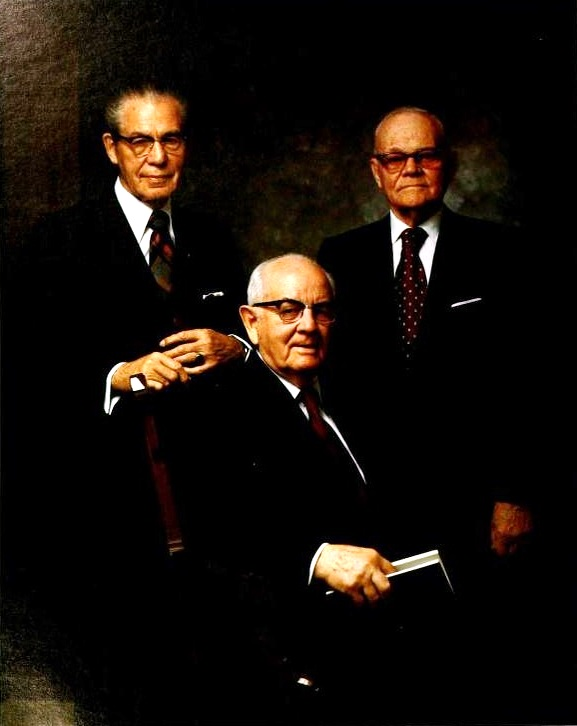
Kimball with counselors N. Eldon Tanner (left) and Marion G. Romney (right)

Beginning in the late 1840s, men of black African descent were prohibited from ordination to the LDS Church's priesthood, which is normally held by all male members who meet church standards of spiritual "worthiness", and from receiving temple ordinances such as the endowment and celestial marriage (sealing). (Note: There were a handful of exceptions to the rule, such as some descendants of Elijah Abel, the first black Latter-day Saint to hold priesthood office. See Newell G. Bringhurst (2006), "The 'Missouri Thesis' Revisited: Early Mormonism, Slavery, and the Status of Black People" in Newell G. Bringhurst and Darron T. Smith, Black and Mormon (Urbana: University of Illinois Press) p. 30) During the 20th century, most LDS church leaders and members believed the policy had originated during founding prophet Joseph Smith's time, but church research in the 1960s and 1970s found no evidence of the prohibition before the presidency of Brigham Young. LDS Church presidents Heber J. Grant and David O. McKay are known to have stated privately that the restriction was a temporary one that would be lifted later by a divine revelation to a church president.

In the years prior to his presidency, Kimball kept a binder of notes and clippings related to the issue. In the first years of his presidency, he was recorded as frequently making the issue one of investigation and prayer. In June 1977, Kimball asked at least three general authorities—apostles Bruce R. McConkie, Thomas S. Monson, and Boyd K. Packer—to write him memoranda "on the doctrinal basis of the prohibition and how a change might affect the Church." McConkie wrote a long treatise concluding there were no scriptural impediments to a change. In 1977, Kimball obtained a personal key to the Salt Lake Temple for entering in the evenings after the temple closed and often spent hours alone in its upper rooms praying for divine guidance on a possible change. On May 30, 1978, Kimball presented his two counselors with a statement that he had written in longhand that removed all racial restrictions on ordination to the priesthood, stating that he "had a good, warm feeling about it".

On June 1, 1978, following the monthly meeting of general authorities in the Salt Lake Temple, Kimball asked his counselors and the ten members of Quorum of the Twelve Apostles then present (Note: Mark E. Petersen was in Ecuador on an assignment and Delbert L. Stapley was in the hospital receiving medical care.) to remain behind for a special meeting. Kimball began by describing his studies, thoughts, and prayers on removing the restriction and on his growing assurance that the time had come for the change. Kimball asked each of the men present to share their views, and all spoke in favor of changing the policy. After all present had shared their views, Kimball led the gathered apostles in a prayer circle to seek final divine approval for the change. As Kimball prayed, many in the group recorded feeling a powerful spiritual confirmation. Bruce R. McConkie later said: "There are no words to describe the sensation, but simultaneously the Twelve and the three members of the First Presidency had the Holy Ghost descend upon them and they knew that God had manifested his will.... I had had some remarkable spiritual experiences before... but nothing of this magnitude." L. Tom Perry described: "I felt something like the rushing of wind. There was a feeling that came over the whole group. When President Kimball got up he was visibly relieved and overjoyed." Gordon B. Hinckley later said: "For me, it felt as if a conduit opened between the heavenly throne and the kneeling, pleading prophet of God who was joined by his Brethren."

The church formally announced the change on June 9, 1978. The story led many national news broadcasts and was on the front page of most American newspapers, and in most largely Latter-day Saint communities in Utah and Idaho, telephone networks were completely jammed with excited callers. The announcement was formally approved by the church at the October 1978 general conference and is included in the LDS Church's edition of the Doctrine and Covenants as Official Declaration 2.

=== Equal Rights Amendment ===
In 1972, the US Congress passed the Equal Rights Amendment (ERA), which introduced an amendment to the US Constitution guaranteeing that equal rights could not be denied by the federal government or any U.S. state on the basis of gender. Upon becoming church president in late 1973, Kimball initially indicated to media outlets that the LDS Church had no official stand on the amendment and made no comment on it. In July 1974, Belle S. Spafford, the general president of the Relief Society, the LDS Church's women's organization and one of the oldest and largest women's organizations in the world, gave a public talk in New York City in which she expressed her view that the amendment's objectives would be better achieved through legislation, not the constitutional amendment, which she feared was too broad and vague. Her successor, Barbara B. Smith, echoed those sentiments later that year in a talk at the church's Institute of Religion at the University of Utah, which was followed by a supporting editorial in the LDS Church News.

The two women's comments, combined with the Church News editorial, greatly increased opposition to the ERA among the Utah populace, and when the Utah State Legislature voted on its ratification in February 1975, it was defeated by a wide margin. (Note: The US Constitution requires any new constitutional amendment to be ratified by at least three-fourths of all U.S. state legislatures to be adopted.) Kimball and his counselors in the First Presidency did not release a formal statement on the ERA until October 1976, when the amendment was only four states away from passing. The statement indicated that the First Presidency recognized and "deplore[d]" the legal injustices women had suffered throughout history, but warned that the amendment would not help women and "could indeed bring them far more restraints and repression." In August 1978, the First Presidency issued a second statement elaborating on the first, in which Kimball and his counselors stated that the ERA's "deceptively simple language ... [constitutes] encouragement of those who seek a unisex society, [and] an increase in the practice of homosexual and lesbian activities." That year he described Heavenly Mother with "the ultimate in maternal modesty" as an example to women.

Contemporary media coverage of the church's opposition to the ERA was frequently negative. At the October 1980 General Conference, about 30 picketers marched outside the Salt Lake Tabernacle, and when Kimball was presented to the congregation during the customary sustaining of church officers, three women stood and shouted "No! ERA policy, no!" At the dedication of the church's new temple in Seattle, in November 1980, several dozen protesters demonstrated. Minor protests and pickets continued across the United States at major church events until June 1982, when the ratification period expired without the amendment reaching the three-fourths of the states needed for ratification.

=== Physical decline and death ===
On March 28, 1975, his 80th birthday, Kimball said: "I can't believe that I am eighty years old.... I don't feel eighty, and I don't think in those terms." However, Kimball suffered from a myriad of mostly minor health issues ranging from blurred vision to osteoarthritis in his spine. In July 1979, Kimball suffered a series of three minor strokes, theorized to have been caused by small nylon fibers shed by his artificial heart valve, which briefly incapacitated him but had little lasting effect. In September 1979, Kimball suddenly experienced loss of strength throughout his entire body without affecting his mental clarity. A CT scan indicated Kimball had a subdural hematoma, but its cause was never pinpointed. A neurosurgeon drilled a small hole in Kimball's skull, just above his right ear, from which nearly one cup (235 mL) of blood and fluid drained out. Kimball left the hospital 12 days after his operation and insisted on participating in the October 1979 general conference. In November 1979, Kimball underwent a similar operation on another less severe hematoma.

In the summer of 1981, Kimball's health began to decline rapidly. He began suffering from bouts of confusion and difficulty speaking. Realizing his deteriorating capacity and the poor health of his two counselors in the church's First Presidency, Kimball called Gordon B. Hinckley as an additional counselor to assist in the church's daily administration. Shortly following Hinckley's selection, Kimball developed a third subdural hematoma of greater seriousness than the previous two. The subsequent surgery left Kimball with intermittent difficulty in speaking and activity and further damaged his vision and hearing. By 1982, Kimball was rarely well enough to appear in public, and his leadership as church president was largely limited to giving final approval or denial to more important church matters that were brought to him by Hinckley. However, Kimball still attended at least one session of each semiannual general conference of the church until his death. At the Sunday afternoon session of the church's April 1982 general conference, Kimball unexpectedly took the pulpit to deliver a short closing message, which proved to be his final public address:

My beloved brothers and sisters, this is a great experience for me. I have waited for this day and hoped for it and believed for it. I have a great love for the people of this Church, and gratitude for the love expressed by them and by all the people of these valleys. So as I express that love for you and for the memory of the great experiences I've had with you, I bear my testimony: this work is divine, the Lord is at the helm, the Church is true, and all is well. God bless you, brothers and sisters, I pray in the name of the Lord Jesus Christ, amen.

— Kimball's final public address (LDS Church general conference, April 1982)

Over subsequent years, Kimball would occasionally attend meetings in the Salt Lake Temple and was able to give assent or direction on matters of significance, such as the calling of Russell M. Nelson and Dallin H. Oaks to the Quorum of the Twelve Apostles in 1984, but he was otherwise mostly incapacitated.

Kimball was mentally alert for his 90th birthday on March 28, 1985, and he attended that week's meeting of the First Presidency and the Twelve Apostles in the Salt Lake Temple. In November 1985, he suffered a recurrence of a previous bleeding peptic ulcer, and his family decided not to take surgical action. Kimball died shortly after 10:00 pm on November 5, 1985, at the age of 90. One of Kimball's final utterances, which he had repeated several times in the days before his death, was "My life is at an end now. She's so happy, oh so very happy." When asked who was meant by "she", Kimball indicated his mother, Olive Woolley Kimball, who had died in 1906, when he was 11. His funeral was held on November 9, 1985.

Kimball's teachings as an apostle were the 2007 course of study in the LDS Church's Sunday Relief Society and Melchizedek priesthood classes.

== Awards and recognition ==
In 1977, he received the Golden Plate Award of the American Academy of Achievement.

In 1996, a bronze statue of his likeness, commissioned by Arizona land developers Gary Walker and Buddy Johnson, was unveiled in Arizona.

== Works ==
- Kimball, Spencer W. (1969). The Miracle of Forgiveness. Bookcraft, Inc. ISBN 978-0-88494-192-7.
- ——— (1972). Faith Precedes the Miracle: Based on Discourses of Spencer W. Kimball. Deseret Book Company. ISBN 978-0-87747-490-6.
- ——— (1975). One Silent Sleepless Night. Deseret Book Company. ISBN 978-0884942917.
- ——— (1976). Marriage & Divorce. Deseret Book Company. ISBN 978-0877476351.
- ——— (1977). Tragedy or Destiny?. Deseret Book Company. ISBN 978-0877476528.
- ——— (1978). Marriage. Deseret Book Company. ISBN 978-0877476757.
- ——— (1981). President Kimball Speaks Out. Deseret Book Company.
- ——— (1987). Proclaiming the Gospel: President Kimball Speaks on Missionary Work. Bookcraft, Inc.
- ——— (1982). Edward L. Kimball (ed.). The Teachings of Spencer W. Kimball. Bookcraft, Inc. ISBN 978-1-57008-938-1.
- ——— (2006). Teachings of Presidents of the Church: Spencer W. Kimball. The Church of Jesus Christ of Latter-day Saints.

== See also ==
- The Church of Jesus Christ of Latter-day Saints in Arizona

== Works cited ==
- Anderson, Vern (November 6, 1985). "Mormon President Spencer W. Kimball Dead At Age 90". Associated Press.
- "Spencer Kimball Dies at 90; Was Mormon Church Leader". New York Times. Associated Press. November 9, 1985.
- Church Educational System (2005). "Chapter 12: Spencer W. Kimball: Twelfth President of the Church". Presidents of the Church: Student Manual. LDS Church.
- Dart, John (November 6, 1985). "Spencer W. Kimball, 90, Dies; Led Mormon Church". Los Angeles Times.
- Gibbons, Francis M. (1995). Spencer W. Kimball: Resolute Disciple, Prophet of God. Salt Lake City: Deseret Book. ISBN 0-87579-994-9..
- Kimball, Edward L.; Kimball, Andrew E. Jr. (1977). Spencer W. Kimball. Salt Lake City: Bookcraft. ISBN 0-88494-330-5..
- Kimball, Edward L. (2005). Lengthen Your Stride: The Presidency of Spencer W. Kimball. Salt Lake City: Deseret Book. ISBN 1-59038-457-1..
- ——— (2008). "Spencer W. Kimball and the Revelation on Priesthood". BYU Studies. 47 (2): 4–78.
- McConkie, Joseph Fielding (2003). The Bruce R. McConkie Story: Reflections of a Son. Salt Lake City: Deseret Book. ISBN 1-59038-205-6..
- Prince, Gregory A.; Wright, Wm. Robert (2005). David O. McKay and the Rise of Modern Mormonism. Salt Lake City: University of Utah Press. ISBN 0-87480-822-7..

The Church of Jesus Christ of Latter-day Saints titles
| Preceded by Harold B. Lee | President of the Church; December 30, 1973–November 5, 1985 | Succeeded by Ezra Taft Benson |
| Preceded by Harold B. Lee | President of the Quorum of the Twelve Apostles; July 7, 1972–December 30, 1973 | Succeeded by Ezra Taft Benson |
| Preceded by Harold B. Lee | Quorum of the Twelve Apostles; October 7, 1943–December 30, 1973 | Succeeded by Ezra Taft Benson |
