= Edward Kimball (teacher) =

American teacher (1823–1901)

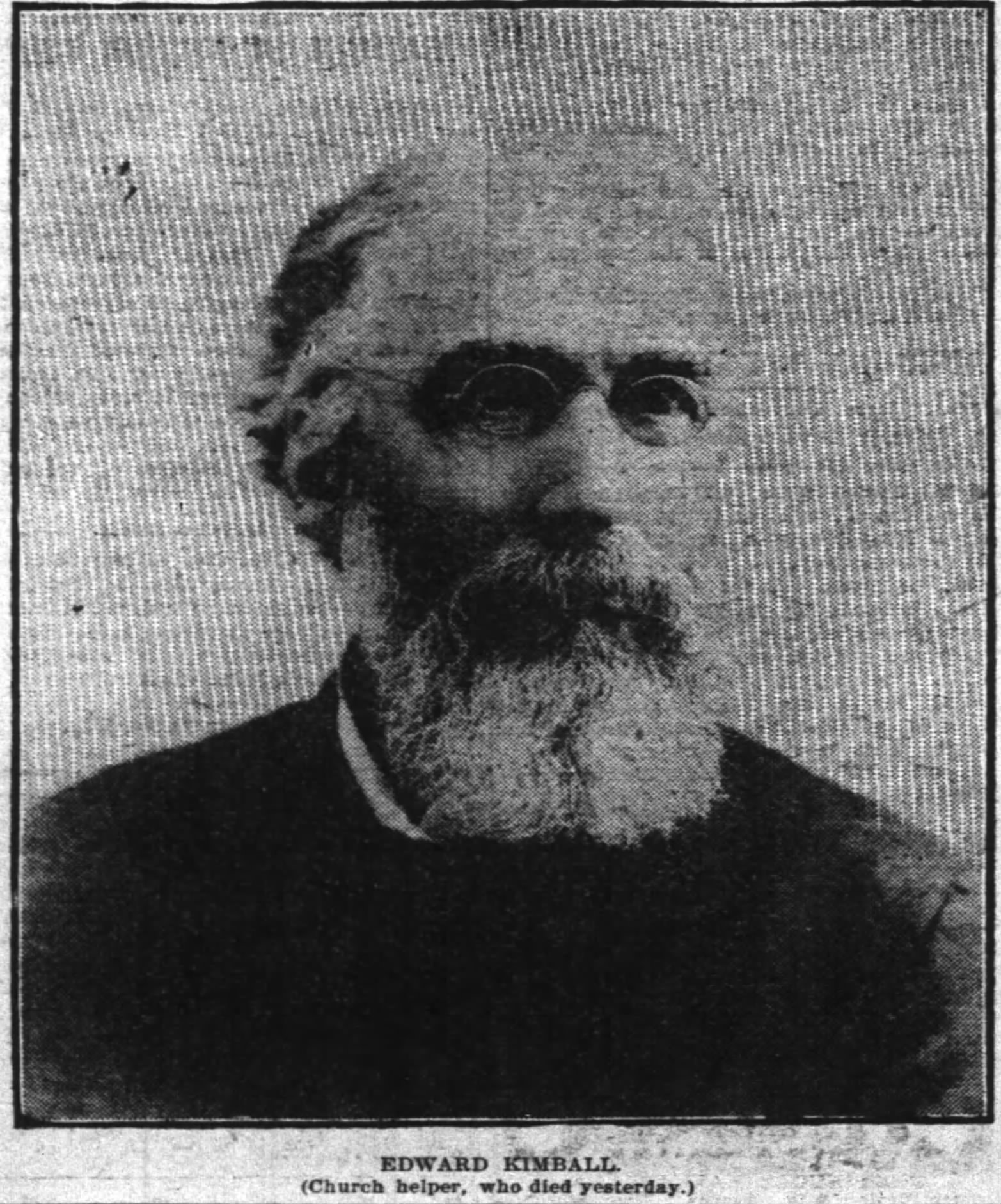
- Born: July 29, 1823; Rowley, Massachusetts, U.S.
- Died: June 5, 1901 (aged 77); Oak Park, Illinois, U.S.
- Spouses: Emma Jane Henchman (m. 1851; died 1871) Laura L. Harris (m. 1873)
- Children: 4

Edward Kimball (July 29, 1823 – June 5, 1901) was an American Sunday School teacher known for converting 19th-century evangelist Dwight L. Moody to Christianity. Kimball also assisted churches across the United States in eliminating significant financial debts. He had assisted 21 churches in "liberating" debt by the age of 45.

== Early life ==
Edward Kimball was born in Rowley, Massachusetts, in 1823 to Richard and Elizabeth Kimball. His parents wanted him to pursue religious studies, but illness at the time prevented Kimball from doing this. He would follow his father as a public school teacher in Rowley. Later, at age 23, Kimball moved to Boston. Eventually, he became head of Kimball, Felt and Wentworth, a firm of carpet dealers.

== Sunday School teacher ==
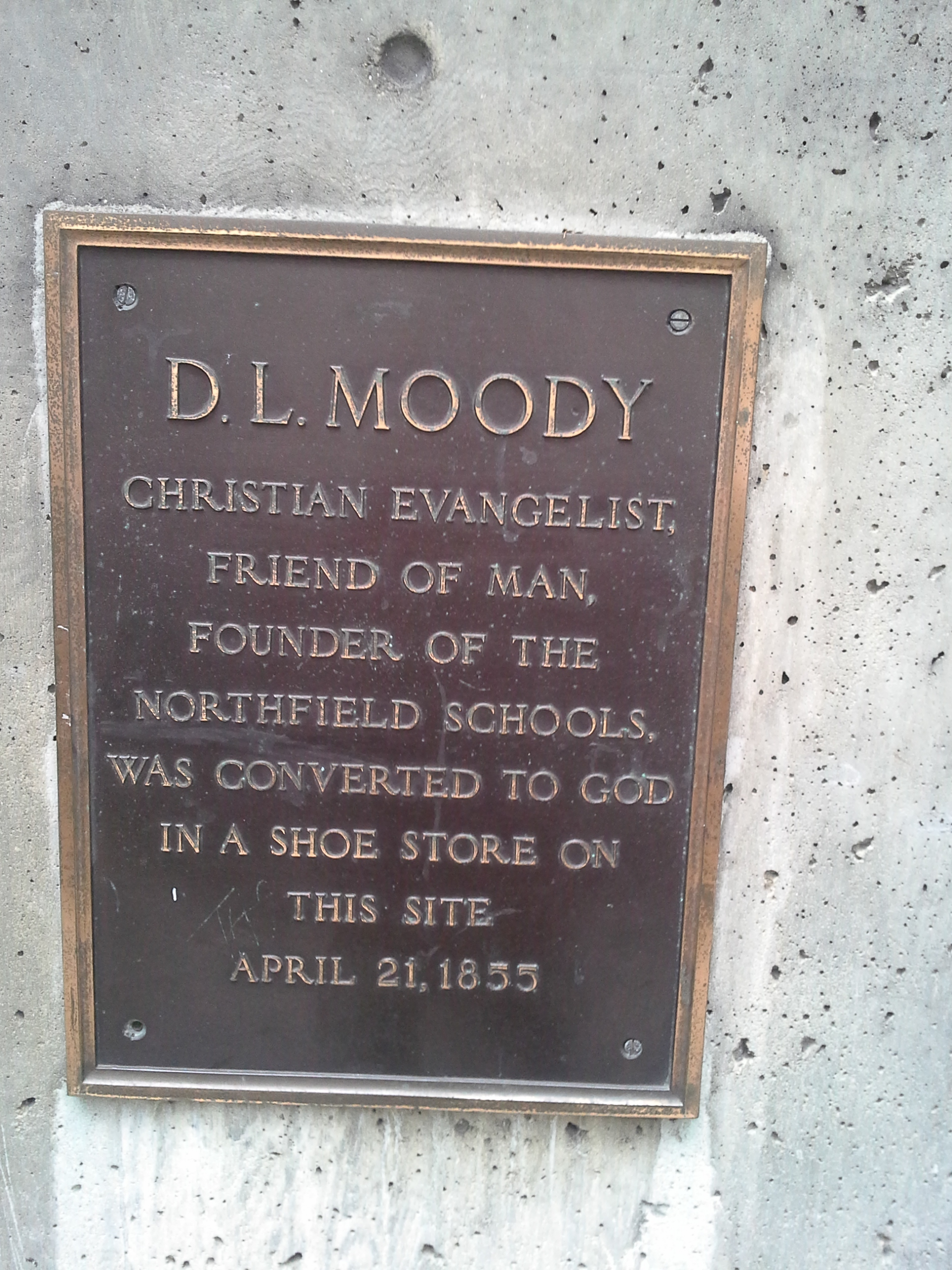
Plaque commemorating the spot on Court Street in Boston where Dwight Moody was converted to Christianity by Kimball in 1855

While in Boston, Kimball joined the Mount Vernon Congregational Church and served as a church officer and Sunday School teacher. His class was filled with teenage boys, including Dwight L. Moody. During one of Moody's first classes, Kimball asked the attendees to turn to a specific Bible chapter in the book of John. Moody, unfamiliar with the books of the Bible or the location of John, turned instead to the front of the Bible. Classmates laughed at Moody not knowing the books of the Bible. Kimball, however, handed Moody his own Bible open to the correct passage and asked Moody to read it. Moody was greatly impressed by Kimball's kindness and continued to attend Sunday School. In 1855, after nearly a year of lessons, Kimball visited Moody at his place of employment, Holton Shoe Store, a business owned by one of Moody's uncles, and during conversation between the two in the store's stockroom, Moody was converted to Christianity. Moody was eighteen years old at his conversion.

D. L. Moody went on to evangelize worldwide and found the Northfield Seminary for Young Ladies and the Mount Hermon School for Boys, the Moody Bible Institute and Moody Publishing.

In 1868, Kimball and his family left Boston and moved to New York to work in a wholesale hardware business.

== Church debt raiser ==
Kimball and his family moved to Chicago, Illinois, in 1872, the year after the Great Fire. He worked in sales for A. H. Andrews and Company, a noted office and school furniture store. In 1877, while traveling for work in northern California, Kimball was troubled upon learning that several churches in the area had high debt. He devised a plan to help reduce or eliminate the debt. Kimball became a "pioneer in the work of raising the debts" of various churches. In 1879, Kimball retired from the furniture firm to devote himself to church debt reduction.

Kimball's method of reducing debt was simple, according to one news report. He would share with the congregation reasons why debt stifles the church's work. He would then divide the total debt into manageable amounts. During a Sunday service, Kimball would publicly ask for members to volunteer to pay off specific amounts or subscriptions until the entire debt was accounted for. No one would be required to pay their subscription unless the entire debt was accounted for.

During the twenty-four years Kimball assisted churches, he raised $15 million to eliminate church debts. Churches included First Congregational Church of Oakland (CA) for $45,000, New York Presbyterian Church for $110,000, Union Park Congregational Church of Chicago for $30,000 and at least twenty others.

== Family ==
Kimball and his first wife, Emma J. Henchman, had four children: Ella, Richard Henry, Edward Harris, and Harriet. Around 1871, Richard Henry, who later became a prominent Chicago dentist, was visiting an uncle in Worcester, Massachusetts, and attended a missions service conducted by Moody. Henry, as he was known, introduced himself to Moody as the son of Moody's old Sunday School teacher. Moody asked if Henry was a Christian, and when Henry said he was not sure, Moody spoke with him and eventually converted Henry to Christianity. Henry was seventeen years old at his conversion.

Kimball married twice. His first wife, Emma, died in 1871. He married his second wife, Laura L. Harris of Brooklyn, New York, in 1873. Kimball died in 1901 after a short illness and was buried at Rosehill Cemetery and Mausoleum in Chicago, Illinois.

== Legacy ==
Kimball's conversion of Moody to Christianity has been used as an example of the influence that one "ordinary" individual can have in spreading Christianity through evangelism. Religious scholars have noted the "direct chain" and growth in the number of Christian believers from Kimball's conversion of Moody to the conversion of evangelist Billy Graham. One scholar noted Moody preached in England at the church of F. B. Meyer and "revolutionized" Meyer's ministry. J. Wilbur Chapman, who later heard Meyer preach, was inspired to evangelize. Chapman was also associated with the YMCA, where he met former National League baseball outfielder Billy Sunday, who later converted to Christianity and worked with Chapman for two years on his Christian crusades. At one of Billy Sunday's own crusades, Mordecai Ham was asked to preach. One sixteen-year-old boy was in the audience and was converted to Christianity by Ham. This boy, Billy Graham, later also became an evangelist.
