= Edward L. Kimball =

American legal scholar (1930–2016)

Edward Kimball
- Born: Edward Lawrence Kimball; September 23, 1930; Arizona, U.S.
- Died: November 21, 2016 (aged 86); Provo, Utah, U.S.
- Spouse: Evelyn Bee Madsen
- Children: 7
- Parent: Spencer W. Kimball (father)

Academic background
- Education: University of Utah (BA, LLB); University of Pennsylvania (JD, LLM)

Academic work
- Discipline: Law; History
- Sub-discipline: Evidence law Appellate law Mormon studies
- Institutions: University of Montana; University of Wisconsin–Madison; Brigham Young University

Edward Lawrence Kimball (September 23, 1930 – November 21, 2016) was an American scholar, lawyer, and historian who was a law professor at Brigham Young University (BYU).

Kimball was the son of Spencer W. Kimball, a president of the Church of Jesus Christ of Latter-day Saints (LDS Church), and his wife, Camilla Eyring Kimball, and wrote notable biographies of his father. Mormon historians have described these as "well crafted" biographies.

== Early life and education ==
Kimball was born in Arizona on September 23, 1930, and he suffered from polio as a child. He served as a missionary for the LDS Church in the Netherlands. He received a bachelor's degree in history and a law degree from the University of Utah. Kimball then went on to earn two further law degrees from the University of Pennsylvania.

== Career ==
As a lawyer, Kimball specialized in evidence law. He also authored a biography of Frank J. Remington and wrote on criminal cases in appellate courts.

Kimball served in several positions in the LDS Church, including bishop. Prior to joining the faculty of BYU, Kimball was a law professor and chairman of the Curriculum Committee at the University of Wisconsin Law School. Kimball started his career as a law professor at the University of Montana, where he taught from 1956 to 1962. He was a professor at the University of Wisconsin from 1962 to 1973. He was one of the founding faculty at BYU Law School from 1973 until 1995, when he was granted emeritus status. Kimball was the inaugural holder of the Ernest L. Wilkinson Chair in the BYU law school.

== Writings ==
Kimball's biography of his father has been listed among "60 Significant Mormon Biographies". Lengthen Your Stride, his history of his father's church presidency, has also been widely recognized.

Kimball wrote an article on Henry Eyring and Harvey Fletcher published in Dialogue: A Journal of Mormon Thought. Kimball served as the editor of his father's book Faith Precedes the Miracle. Kimball was also the compiler and editor of the widely cited work, The Teachings of Spencer W. Kimball (Salt Lake City: Bookcraft, 1982).

Kimball has published an in-depth study on the 1978 Revelation on Priesthood received by his father. He has also written an article on the history of LDS Church temple admissions standards.

== Personal life ==
Kimball married the Evelyn Bee Madsen in 1954. They had seven children. Kimball died in Provo, Utah, on November 21, 2016, at the age of 86.

== Publications ==
- Spencer W. Kimball, The Twelfth President of the Church of Jesus Christ of Latter-day Saints (with Andrew E. Kimball, Jr.), Bookcraft, 1977.
- Camilla: A Biography of Camilla Eyring Kimball. With Carolina Eyring Miner. Deseret Book, 1980.
- Ed., The Teachings of Spencer W. Kimball. Bookcraft, 1982.
- The Story of Spencer W. Kimball, A Short Man, A Long Stride. with A. E. Kimball, Jr. Bookcraft, 1985.
- Lengthen Your Stride: The Presidency of Spencer W. Kimball. Deseret Book, 2005.
- Andrew Kimball: Father of a Prophet. Deseret Book, 2011.
