= Linguistics and the Book of Mormon =

Linguistic issues with the Book of Mormon

The professed doctrine of most denominations within the Latter Day Saint movement is that the Book of Mormon is a 19th-century translation by Joseph Smith of a record of ancient inhabitants of the American continents, written in a script which the book refers to as "Reformed Egyptian". There is no evidence of a language matching this description nor any evidence of Old World linguistic influences in the New World whatsoever.

To support the Book of Mormon's historicity, scholars like Donald W. Parry claim that the text contains unique stylistic forms of Reformed Egyptian that Joseph Smith and his contemporaries were unlikely to have known. What is better attested to is that the Book of Mormon includes language that is anachronistic and reflective of its 19th-century and English-language origins consistent with Smith's upbringing and life experience, as well as the books and other literature published just preceding the time that the Book of Mormon was published.

== Native American language ==
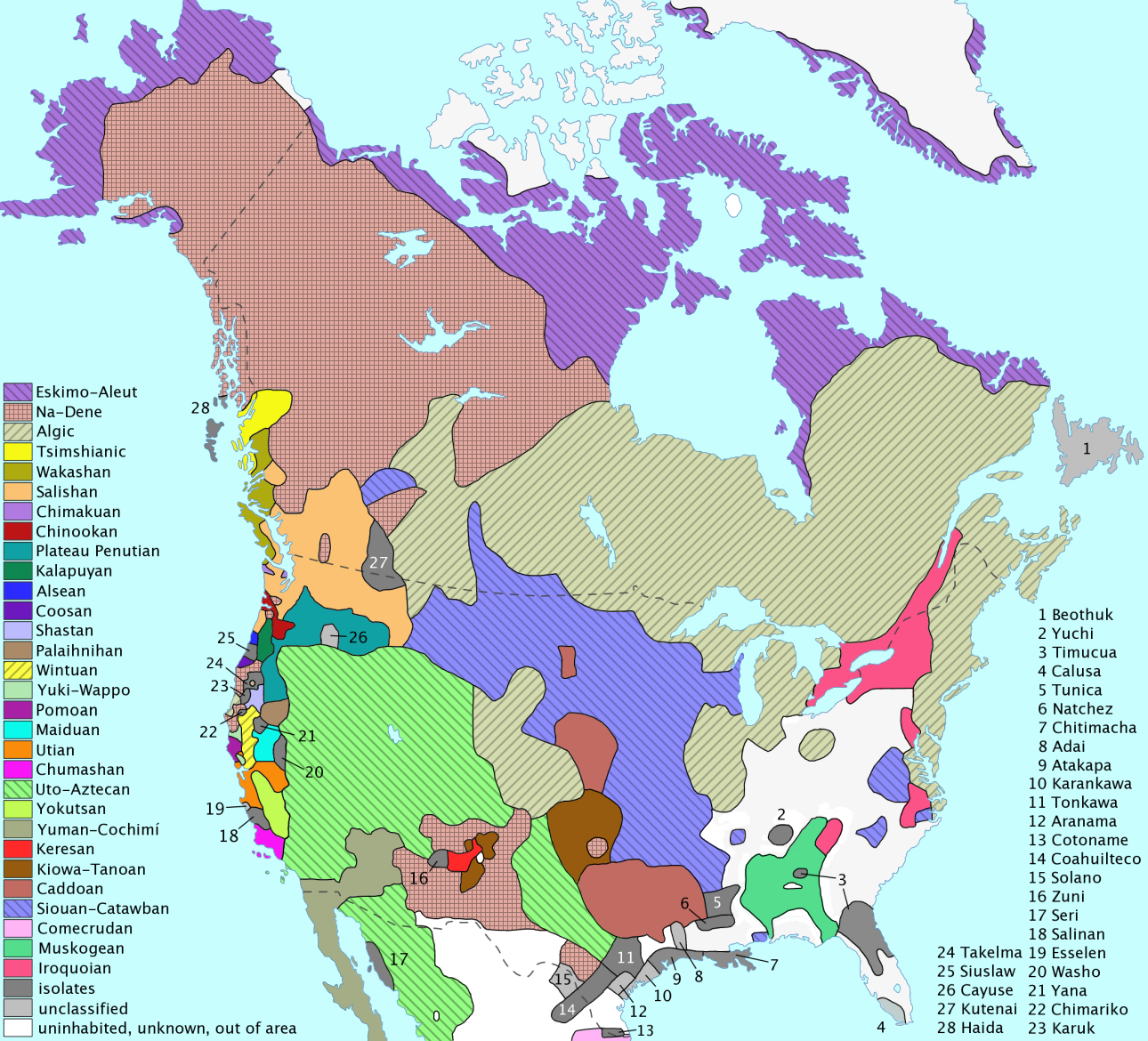
Pre-contact distribution of North American language families north of Mexico

In 1922, LDS Church general authority B. H. Roberts (1857–1933) conducted a review of the research regarding language development and dialects among the Native American peoples; the University of Illinois Press published Roberts's study posthumously in 1985 as Studies of the Book of Mormon.

Roberts based his discussion on the assumption that the majority of Native Americans descend from the peoples described in the Book of Mormon – as is implied by the hemispheric model of Book of Mormon geography, which was the prevailing view among Mormons at the time. Roberts noted that linguistic evidence among the Native American peoples does not support the Book of Mormon narrative, inasmuch as the diverse language stocks and dialects that exist would not have had enough time to develop from a single language dating from AD 400 (the approximate date of the conclusion of the Book of Mormon record). Roberts noted the following facts to be true at that point to be:

1. That there are a large number of separate language stocks in America that show very little relationship to each other.
2. That it would take a long time—much longer than that recognized as "historic times"—to develop these dialects and stocks where the development is conceived of as arising from a common source of origin—some primitive language.
3. That there is no connection between the American languages and the language of any people of the Old World. New World languages appear to be indigenous to the New World.

The fragmentation of language into many groups in the pre-Columbian Americas is at odds with a hemispherical geography model of the Book of Mormon’s peoples – and indeed with the Book of Mormon’s narrative of agricultural Nephites coming to the Americas and building a large-scale society. In Guns, Germs, and Steel, anthropologist Jared Diamond writes that “had any food-producing Native American peoples succeeded in spreading far with their crops and livestock and rapidly replacing hunter-gatherers over a large area, (Note: As Diamond established earlier throughout Guns, Germs, and Steel, this has been the established pattern throughout history; hunter-gatherer societies are typically displaced by agricultural societies, due to the larger populations (population densities) which can be supported by farming than by hunting/gathering.) they would have left legacies of easily recognized language families, as in Eurasia,” which did not occur.

Mainstream investigations hold that there is no known special similarity between Native American languages and ancient Egyptian.

== Linguistic anachronisms ==
A variety of linguistic anachronisms show it to be the product of nineteenth century American authorship. These anachronisms include words that represent concepts that are not known to have existed in the Americas between 2500 BC and AD 400, or in ancient Israel and Judah.

=== "Christ" and "Messiah" ===
The words "Christ" and "Messiah" are used several hundred times throughout the Book of Mormon. The first instance of the word "Christ" occurs in parts of the narrative that many Mormons attribute to between 559 and 545 BC. The first instance of the word "Messiah" occurs in the narrative that Mormons believe happened around 600 BC.

"Christ" is the English transliteration of the Greek word Χριστός (transliterated as Christós); it is relatively synonymous with the Hebrew word משיח, pronounced [maˈʃi.aχ] and rendered "Messiah". Both words have the meaning of "anointed", and are used in the Bible to refer to "the Anointed One". In Greek translations of the Old Testament (including the Septuagint), the word "Christ" is used for the Hebrew "Messiah", and in Hebrew translations of the New Testament, the word "Messiah" is used for the Greek "Christ". Any passage in the Bible that uses the word "Christ" can substitute the word "Messiah" or "the Messiah" with no change in meaning (e.g., Matthew 1:1, 16, 18).

The Book of Mormon uses both terms throughout the book. In the vast majority of cases, it uses the terms in an identical manner as the Bible, where it does not matter which word is used:

And now, my sons, remember, remember that it is upon the rock of our Redeemer, who is Christ, the Son of God, that ye must build your foundation". (Helaman 5:12).

And after he had baptized the Messiah with water, he should behold and bear record that he had baptized the Lamb of God, who should take away the sins of the world." (1 Nephi 10:10).

Richard Packham argues that the Greek word "Christ" in the Book of Mormon challenges the authenticity of the work since Smith clearly stated that "there was no Greek or Latin upon the plates from which I, through the grace of the Lord, translated the Book of Mormon."

=== "Church" and "synagogue" ===
The word "church" first occurs in 1 Nephi 4:26, where a prophet named Nephi disguises himself as Laban, a prominent man in Jerusalem whom Nephi had slain:

And he [Laban's servant], supposing that I spake of the brethren of the church, and that I was truly that Laban whom I had slain, wherefore he did follow me (1 Nephi 4:26).

According to the Book of Mormon, this exchange happened in Jerusalem, around 600 BC. The meaning of the word "church" in the Book of Mormon is more comparable to usage in the Bible than Modern English. The concept of a church, meaning "a convocation of believers", existed among the House of Israel prior to Christianity. For instance, Psalms 89:5 speaks of praising the Lord "in the congregation of the saints"; the Septuagint contains the Greek word ecclesia for "congregation", which is also translated as "church" in the New Testament.

A similar question regards the word "synagogue", found in Alma 16:13:

And Alma and Amulek went forth preaching repentance to the people in their temples, and in their sanctuaries, and also in their synagogues, which were built after the manner of the Jews (Alma 16:13).

Synagogues did not exist in their modern form before the destruction of the temple and the Babylonian captivity. The oldest known synagogue is located in Delos, Greece, and has been dated to 150 BC.

=== Other anachronisms ===
Craig L. Blomberg has pointed out several verses in the Book Mormon apparently similar to biblical verses in the King James version of the Bible. According to Blomberg, 2 Nephi 31:13 includes overt references to Acts 2:38, Matthew 3:11, 1 Corinthians 13:1, and were most likely written with their direct influence in mind. Furthermore, Blomberg claims that 2 Nephi 31:21 contains allusions to Acts 4:12. Blomberg summarizes his overall position on Book of Mormon anachronisms as follows: "Indeed, the entire Book of Mormon abounds with explicit references to Christ, to his life and ministry and to the three persons of the Godhead long before New Testament times ... even though none of these concepts or terms ever appear in these forms in the Old Testament or any other ancient Jewish literature."

== Stylometry ==
In 1980, researchers at LDS Church-owned Brigham Young University used stylometric techniques they called "wordprint analysis" to examine possible Book of Mormon authorship, through statistical analysis of the occurrence of specific words and phrases. They concluded that none of the Book of Mormon selections they studied resembled writings of any of the suggested nineteenth-century authors, including Joseph Smith. Jerald and Sandra Tanner challenged these findings on various points, most notably questioning the reliability of the data sources used and the methodology of the "wordprint analysis". Additionally, D. James Croft wrote in Sunstone that there were several flaws in the methodology that were vulnerable to criticism.

In a 1991 study for the journal History and Computing, David Holmes used a multivariate technique to analyze the Book of Mormon. Holmes used the Doctrine and Covenants and the letters and diary entries collected by Dean C. Jessee in The Personal Writings of Joseph Smith as reliable sources for Smith's writing. Holmes concluded that the Book of Mormon was produced by Joseph Smith. He noted that "the style of [Smith’s] 'prophetic voice' as evidenced by the main cluster of the textual samples studied, differs from the style of his personal writings or dictations of a personal nature."

In a 2008 peer-reviewed stylometric study published in Literary and Linguistic Computing, researchers affiliated with Stanford University used Burrows's Delta and nearest shrunken centroid (NSC) classification to compare chapters of the Book of Mormon against writings from a closed set of candidate nineteenth-century authors, including Sidney Rigdon, Solomon Spalding, Oliver Cowdery, and Parley P. Pratt, along with control authors Henry Wadsworth Longfellow and Joel Barlow. Smith was not included in the closed set of authors, as the authors contend that no reliable corpus of Joseph Smith text could be identified with confidence. In contrast with Holmes's methodology, the authors argued that neither the Doctrine and Covenants nor the writings collected in The Personal Writings of Joseph Smith could be reliably treated as exclusively Smith-authored texts because of the involvement of editors and scribes, including Rigdon and Cowdery. The study reported that Rigdon most frequently received the highest or second-highest attribution probabilities across chapters of the Book of Mormon, while Spalding also showed recurrent attribution signals. The authors additionally identified a correlated Cowdery signal, particularly in the Book of Alma, where chapters attributed most strongly to Cowdery were frequently paired with Rigdon as the next most probable contributor. The authors concluded that this pattern was consistent with possible collaborative nineteenth-century authorship involving Rigdon, Spalding, and Cowdery.

A subsequent peer-reviewed response published in the same journal by researchers affiliated with Brigham Young University criticized the earlier study's use of closed-set NSC classification, contending that the Book of Mormon authorship question was fundamentally an open-set problem. The authors argued that if the true author is absent from the candidate pool, closed-set NSC methods can produce artificially inflated posterior probabilities for incorrect candidates. To illustrate this, the authors applied the same closed-set methodology to portions of The Federalist Papers written by Alexander Hamilton while excluding Hamilton from the candidate set and found that the classifier frequently assigned high posterior probabilities to Sidney Rigdon, Oliver Cowdery, and Parley P. Pratt. Using a modified open-set NSC approach that allowed for the possibility of unidentified authors outside the candidate pool, together with additional samples drawn from Joseph Smith holograph writings, the authors reanalyzed the Book of Mormon data from the earlier study and reported substantially different attribution results from those produced by the original closed-set analysis. In their reanalysis, many chapters were assigned to an "unobserved author" rather than to Sidney Rigdon, Solomon Spalding, or other nineteenth-century candidates. The authors concluded that these results indicated that the earlier closed-set analysis had overstated attribution confidence and that the available stylometric evidence did not reliably support either sole authorship by Joseph Smith or Spalding–Rigdon authorship.

== Proper names ==
Critics have pointed out the appearance of names in the Book of Mormon which appear to be anachronistic. On the other hand, apologists have pointed out alleged similarities between Book of Mormon names and names which Smith would not have known but which could signal authenticity.

=== Hebrew names ===
Critics have pointed out that many of the names in the Book of Mormon that are not drawn from the King James Bible are found in the local environment around Palmyra, New York, and would have been known to Smith. Richard Packham has pointed out that several Biblical Hebrew names, including "Aaron", "Ephraim", and "Levi" are listed as Jaredites in the Book of Ether. He argues that these are anachronisms, since the Jaredites are supposed to have originated from the time of the Tower of Babel, and presumably did not speak Hebrew. In addition, Packham has pointed out that while "Isabel" is derived from the ancient Hebrew Elizabeth, the name Isabel did not exist until 12th century Spain, which he argues is evidence against the authenticity of the Book of Mormon.

=== Egyptian names ===
In his book Lehi in the Desert, Mormon apologist Hugh Nibley compares names found in the Book of Mormon with ancient Egyptian names from Upper Egypt. The comparisons allegedly show that many names in the Book of Mormon are similar to names in a certain region and era of ancient Egypt.

Smith, in a letter written in 1843 to the Mormon publication Millennial Star, wrote that the name "Mormon" came from "the Egyptian Mon, hence with the addition of more, or the contraction, mor, we have the word Mormon, which means, literally, more good." Benjamin Urrutia suggests the name "Mormon" is derived from Egyptian "mor" (𓌸 "love") and "mon" (𓏠 "established forever"), rendering "Mormon" (thus reconstructed as 𓌸𓏠) to mean "love established forever". Packham criticizes Smith's interpretation, stating that the English word "more" or "mor" is out of place in an Egyptian name.

=== Greek names ===
In 1843, Smith stated publicly "there was no Greek or Latin upon the plates from which I … translated the Book of Mormon." Richard Packham has pointed out that the Book of Mormon contains some Greek and Latin names, some of which are hellenizations of Hebrew names (e.g., "Antipas", "Archeantus", "Esrom", "Ezias", "Judea", and "Zenos") and some of which are Greek or Latin.

== See also ==
- Book of Mormon and the King James Bible
- Pre-Columbian transoceanic contact theories
- Textual criticism of the Old Testament
- Textual criticism of the New Testament

== Sources ==
- Abanes, Richard (2003). One Nation Under Gods: A History of the Mormon Church. Thunder Mouth Press. ISBN 978-1-56858-283-2.
- Ashment, Edward H (March–April 1980). "The Book of Mormon—A Literal Translation". Sunstone. Vol. 5, no. 2. pp. 10–14.
- Barney, Kevin L. (Spring 2000). "Reflections on the Documentary Hypothesis". Dialogue: A Journal of Mormon Thought. 33 (1): 57–99. doi:10.2307/45226664. JSTOR 45226664. S2CID 254396783.
- Bitton, Davis (1994). "(Review of) New Approaches to the Book of Mormon: Explorations in Critical Methodology". FARMS Review of Books. Vol. 6, no. 1. Provo, Utah: Maxwell Institute. pp. 1–7. Archived from the original on 2006-09-06.
- Carmack, Stanford (2014). "A Look at Some 'Nonstandard' Book of Mormon Grammar". Interpreter: A Journal of Mormon Scripture. 11: 209–262.
- Edwards, Boyd F.; Edwards, W. Farrell (2004). "Does Chiasmus Appear in the Book of Mormon by Chance?" (PDF). BYU Studies Quarterly. 43 (2). Archived from the original (PDF) on 2007-02-03.
- Hansen, Klaus (1970). "Reflections on The Lion of the Lord". Dialogue: A Journal of Mormon Thought. 5 (2). Salt Lake City: Dialogue Foundation: 110. doi:10.2307/45224212. JSTOR 45224212. S2CID 254402782.
- Hilton, John L. (1997). "On Verifying Wordprint Studies: Book of Mormon Authorship". In Noel B. Reynolds (ed.). Book of Mormon Authorship Revisited: the Evidence for Ancient Origins. Provo, Utah: Foundation for Ancient Research and Mormon Studies. pp. 225–253. ISBN 978-0-934893-25-1.
- Hilton, John L. (1990). "On Verifying Wordprint Studies: Book of Mormon Authorship". Brigham Young University Studies. 30 (3). Provo, Utah.
- Hobbes, Thomas (1995). Three Discourses: A Critical Modern Edition of Newly Identified Works of the Young Hobbes. Urbana and Chicago, Illinois: University of Chicago Press.
- Kroupa, Charles G.; Shipp, Richard C. (1972). From the Mind of God. Salt Lake City: Shipp Bros. Printing.
- Lancaster, James E. (November 15, 1962). "By the Gift and Power of God". Herald. Vol. 109, no. 22. pp. 14–18, 22, 33.
- Larsen, Wayne A.; Rencher, Alvin C.; Layton, Tim (Spring 1980). "Who Wrote the Book of Mormon? An Analysis of Wordprints". BYU Studies Quarterly. 20: 225–51.
- Roberts, B. H. (1985). Brigham D. Madsen (ed.). Studies of the Book of Mormon. University of Illinois Press.
- Nelson, Russell M. (July 1993). "A Treasured Testament". Ensign. Salt Lake City: LDS Church. p. 61.
- Ostler, Blake T. (Spring 1987). "The Book of Mormon as a Modern Expansion of an Ancient Source". Dialogue: A Journal of Mormon Thought. 20 (1): 66–123. doi:10.2307/45225539. JSTOR 45225539.
- Palmer, Grant H. (2002). An Insider's View of Mormon Origins. Salt Lake City: Signature Books. pp. 2–7, 66, 169. ISBN 978-1-56085-157-8.
- Parry, Donald W. (November 2002). "Hebraisms and Other Ancient Peculiarities in the Book of Mormon". In Parry, Donald W.; Peterson, Daniel C.; Welch, John W. (eds.). Echoes and Evidences of the Book of Mormon. Provo, Utah: Foundation for Ancient Research and Mormon Studies. ISBN 978-0-934893-72-5.
- Peterson, Daniel C. (1997). "Yet More Abuse of B. H. Roberts". The FARMS Review. 9 (1). Archived from the original on 2003-08-17.
- Quinn, D. Michael (1998) [1987]. Early Mormonism and the Magic World View. Salt Lake City: Signature Books. pp. 41–ff. ISBN 978-1-56085-089-2.
- Reynolds, Noel B. (2002). Echoes and Evidences of the Book of Mormon. Provo, Utah: Foundation for Ancient Research and Mormon Studies. ISBN 978-0-934893-72-5.
- Rhodes, Michael D. (July 1988). "I Have a Question". Ensign. Vol. 18, no. 7. pp. 51–53. ISSN 0884-1136.
- Ricks, Stephen (1986). "Joseph Smith's Translation of the Book of Mormon". Featured Papers. Provo, Utah: Maxwell Institute. Archived from the original on 2007-04-05.
- Ricks, Stephen (1994). The Translation and Publication of the Book of Mormon. Foundation for Ancient Research and Mormon Studies, official F.A.R.M.S. transcript of video lecture. Archived from the original on 2011-09-30.
- Shipp, Richard C. (1975). Conceptual Patterns of Repetition in the Doctrine and Covenants and Their Implications (Master's thesis). Brigham Young University.
- Skousen, Royal (1994). "The Original Language of the Book of Mormon: Upstate New York Dialect, King James English, or Hebrew?". Journal of Book of Mormon Studies. 3 (1). Provo, Utah: Maxwell Institute: 28–38. JSTOR 44758652. S2CID 162724231. Archived from the original on 2011-09-30.
- Skousen, Royal (2005). "The Archaic Vocabulary of the Book of Mormon". FARMS Insights. 25 (5). Maxwell Institute. Archived from the original on 2011-07-19.
- Skousen, Royal (2009). The Book of Mormon: The Earliest Text. New Haven, CT: Yale University Press. ISBN 978-0-30014-218-1.
- Sorenson, John L. (1985). An Ancient American Setting for the Book of Mormon. Salt Lake City: Deseret Book and FARMS. ISBN 978-0-87747-608-5.
- Sorenson, John L. (1992). "When Lehi's Party Arrived in the Land, Did They Find Others There?". Journal of Book of Mormon Studies. 1 (1). Provo, Utah: Maxwell Institute: 1–34. JSTOR 44758619. S2CID 55878207.
- Tanner, Jerald; Tanner, Sandra (July 1989). "A Black Hole in the Book of Mormon". Salt Lake City Messenger. Vol. 72.
- Tanner, Jerald; Tanner, Sandra (April 1993). "The Godmakers II: Under Fire From Within and Without". Salt Lake City Messenger. Vol. 84.
- Tvedtnes, John A. (Autumn 1970). "Hebraisms in the Book of Mormon: A preliminary survey". BYU Studies Quarterly. Provo, Utah: Brigham Young University.
- Tvedtnes, John A. (1997). "A Visionary Man". Journal of Book of Mormon Studies. 6 (2). Provo, Utah: Brigham Young University. JSTOR 44758833. S2CID 164718509. Archived from the original on 2012-02-20.
- Tvedtnes, John A.; Gee, John; Roper, Matthew (2000). "Book of Mormon Names Attested in Ancient Hebrew Inscriptions". Journal of Book of Mormon Studies. 9 (1). Provo, Utah: Maxwell Institute: 40–51. JSTOR 44758905. S2CID 163366857. Archived from the original on 2008-12-23.
- Van Wagoner, Richard S.; Walker, Steven C (Summer 1982). "Joseph Smith: The Gift of Seeing". Dialogue: A Journal of Mormon Thought. 15 (2): 48–68. doi:10.2307/45225078. JSTOR 45225078. S2CID 254395171.
- Welch, John W. (1969). "Chiasmus in the Book of Mormon". BYU Studies Quarterly. 10 (1): 69–84.
- Welch, John W. (1997). "What Does Chiasmus in the Book of Mormon Prove?". In Noel B. Reynolds (ed.). Book of Mormon Authorship Revisited: the Evidence for Ancient Origins. Provo, Utah: Foundation for Ancient Research and Mormon Studies. ISBN 978-0-934893-25-1. Archived from the original on 2008-05-10.
- Welch, John W. (2002). "A Steady Stream of Significant Recognitions". In Parry, Donald W; Peterson, Daniel C. (eds.). Echoes and Evidences of the Book of Mormon. Provo, Utah: Foundation for Ancient Research and Mormon Studies. ISBN 978-0-934893-72-5. Archived from the original on 2008-04-20.
- Weingreen, Jacob (December 31, 1959). A Practical Grammar for Classical Hebrew. Oxford University Press. ISBN 978-0-19-815422-8.
- Welch, John W. (2003). "How Much Was Known about Chiasmus in 1829 When the Book of Mormon Was Translated?". FARMS Review. 15 (1). Provo, Utah: Maxwell Institute. Archived from the original on 2008-03-04.
