= Paul Y. Hoskisson =

American professor of Ancient scripture

Paul Hoskisson
- Born: 1943; Utah
- Education: B.A., M.A., Ph. D Near Eastern Studies
- Alma mater: Brigham Young University; Brandeis University
- Occupation: Religion professor at BYU
- Spouse: Joaquina Hoskisson
- Children: 4

Paul Y. Hoskisson (born 1943) is an American professor of Ancient scripture and former associate dean of Religious Education at Brigham Young University (BYU). In 2008, he was appointed director of the Laura F. Willes Center for Book of Mormon Research.

== Biographical background ==
Hoskisson is a member of the Church of Jesus Christ of Latter-day Saints (LDS Church). He holds bachelor's and master's degrees from BYU and received a Ph.D. in Ancient Near Eastern Studies from Brandeis University in 1986.

Hoskisson's wife is Joaquina V. Hoskisson. She is a native of Spain and a Spanish professor at BYU. They are the parents of four children.

=== Career ===
Hoskisson has taught at BYU since 1981. Before that he taught at the University of Zurich and worked at the University of Tübingen. Hoskisson has also served as Fulbright Program adviser at BYU.

Hoskisson is a member of several professional academic associations, including the Society of Biblical Literature, the American Oriental Society, the American Schools of Oriental Research, and the Mormon History Association. He has served on the board of trustees for the American Schools of Oriental Research.

Hoskisson has published research on the Book of Mormon, the Old Testament, and other LDS subjects. For example, he wrote about pre-600 B.C. scimitars in the Middle East, thus making their presence possible among Lehi and his descendants in the new world in ways that were previously denied. Hoskisson edited Historicity and the Latter-day Saints, an anthology by BYU's Religious Studies Center, in which he contributed a paper on the need for historicity. He also contributed several articles to FARMS' Journal of Book of Mormon Studies that explore possible ancient meanings behind names in the Book of Mormon.

In September 2008, Hoskisson was appointed the director of BYU's Laura F. Willes Center for Book of Mormon Research.

== Published work ==
- Hoskisson, Paul Y. (1973). Peretz's At Night on the Old Market Place: A Faustian Drama as Mirror of an Age. [master's thesis]. Provo, Utah: BYU Dept. of Humanities and Comparative Literature..
- Hoskisson, Paul Y. (Fall 1983). "[Book review of] Isaiah: prophet, seer, and poet". BYU Studies. 23 (4): 503–08.
- Hoskisson, Paul Y. (1986). The Deities and Cult Terms in Mari: An Analysis of the Textual Evidence. [doctoral thesis]. Brandeis University..
- Hoskisson, Paul Y. (1986). "A Latter-day Saint Reading of Isaiah in the Twentieth Century: The Example of Isaiah 6". The Old Testament and the Latter-day Saints: The 14th Annual Sidney B. Sperry Symposium. Orem, Utah: Randall Book Company. pp. 193–210. ISBN 0-934126-96-8.
- Hoskisson, Paul Y. (1989). "Where Was Ur of the Chaldees?". In H. Donl Peterson; Charles D. Tate Jr. (eds.). The Pearl of Great Price: Revelations From God. Religious Studies Center Monograph Series. Vol. 14. Provo, Utah: Religious Studies Center, BYU. pp. 119–136. ISBN 0-88494-683-5.
- Hoskisson, Paul Y. (1990). "Scimetars, Cimeters! We Have Scimitars! Do We Need Another Cimeter?". In Stephen D. Ricks; William J. Hamblin (eds.). Warfare in the Book of Mormon. Provo, Utah: FARMS. ISBN 0-87579-300-2.
- Hoskisson, Paul Y. (Summer 1990). "Explicating the Mystery of the Rejected Foundation Stone: The Allegory of the Olive Tree". BYU Studies. 30 (3): 77–87.
- Hoskisson, Paul Y. (July 1991). "Research and Perspectives: Where Was the Ur of Abraham?". Ensign. Salt Lake City, Utah: The Church of Jesus Christ of Latter-day Saints.
- Hoskisson, Paul Y. (1992). "Book of Mormon Names". In Ludlow, Daniel H (ed.). Encyclopedia of Mormonism. New York: Macmillan Publishing. pp. 186–187. ISBN 0-02-879602-0. OCLC 24502140.
- Hoskisson, Paul Y. (2000). "Lehi and Sariah". Journal of Book of Mormon Studies. 9 (1). Provo, Utah: FARMS.
- Hoskisson, Paul Y. (2000). "What's in a Name?: Nephi". Journal of Book of Mormon Studies. 9 (2). Provo, Utah: FARMS: 64–5. doi:10.5406/jbookmormstud.9.2.0064. S2CID 165077055.
- Hoskisson, Paul Y. (2001). "The Witness for Christ in Psalm 22". Covenants, Prophecies and Hymns of the Old Testament: The 30th Annual Sidney B. Sperry Symposium. Salt Lake City, Utah: Deseret Book. pp. 290–301.
- Hoskisson, Paul Y. (2001). "Need For Historicity: Why Banishing God From History Removes Historical Obligation". In Hoskisson, Paul Y. (ed.). Historicity and the Latter-day Saint Scriptures. Religious Studies Center Monograph Series. Vol. 18. Provo, Utah: Religious Studies Center, BYU. pp. 99–122. ISBN 1-57734-928-8.
- Hoskisson, Paul Y.; Brian M. Hauglid; John Gee (2002). "Irreantum". Journal of Book of Mormon Studies. 11 (1). Provo, Utah: FARMS: 90–3. doi:10.5406/jbookmormstud.11.1.0090.
- Hoskisson, Paul Y. (2003). "Straightening Things Out: The Use of Strait & Straight in the Book of Mormon". Journal of Book of Mormon Studies. 12 (2). Provo, Utah: FARMS: 58–71. doi:10.5406/jbookmormstud.12.2.0058. S2CID 164655466.
- Hoskisson, Paul Y. (2004). "The Name Cumorah". Journal of Book of Mormon Studies. 13 (1–2). Provo, Utah: FARMS: 158–60. doi:10.5406/jbookmormstud.13.1-2.0158. S2CID 254218975.
- Hoskisson, Paul Y., ed. (2005). Sperry Symposium Classics: The Old Testament. Salt Lake City, Utah: Deseret Book. ISBN 1-59038-533-0.
- Hoskisson, Paul Y. (2006). "[Book review of] Did God Have a Wife?". BYU Studies. 45 (2): 186–89.
- Hoskisson, Paul Y.; Michael D. Rhodes (2007). "Ancient Semitic in Egyptian Pyramids?". Journal of Book of Mormon Studies. 16 (1). Provo, Utah: FARMS: 74–75. doi:10.5406/jbookmormstud.16.1.0074. S2CID 254314391.
