= Royal Skousen =

American linguist

Royal J. Skousen
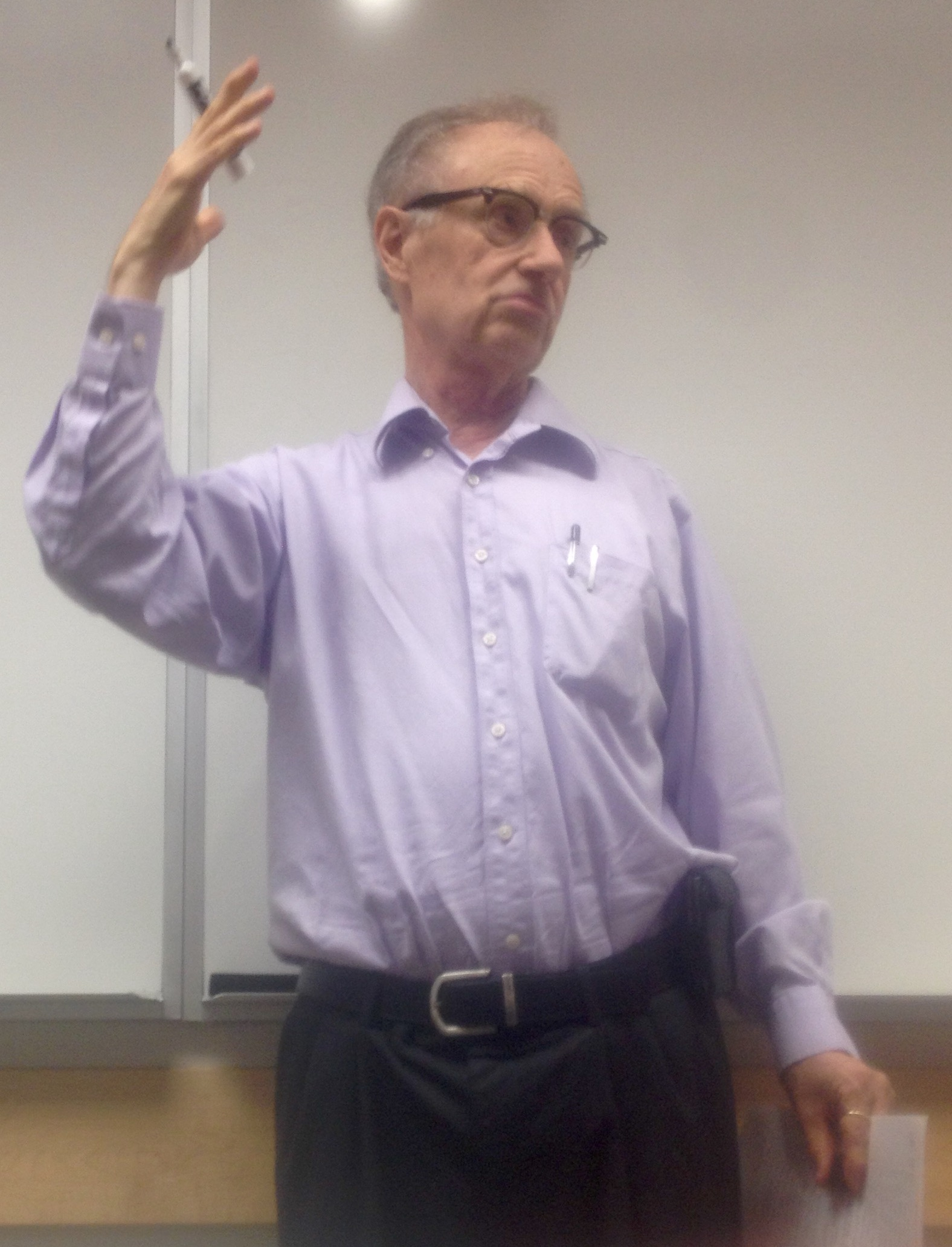
- Skousen in 2016
- Born: Royal Jon Skousen; August 5, 1945 (age 80); Cleveland, Ohio, United States
- Education: Brigham Young University (B.A.) in English; University of Illinois (PhD) in Linguistics
- Occupation: Professor
- Children: 7

Royal Jon Skousen (/ˈskaʊsən/; born August 5, 1945) is an American linguist and retired professor of linguistics and English at Brigham Young University (BYU), where he is editor of the Book of Mormon Critical Text Project. He is "the leading expert on the textual history of the Book of Mormon" and the founder of the analogical modeling approach to language modeling.

== Early life ==
Skousen was born in Cleveland, Ohio, to Leroy Bentley Skousen and Helen Louise Skousen, a Latter-day Saint family and was one of eleven children. He is a nephew to W. Cleon Skousen. He graduated from Sunset High School in Beaverton, Oregon.

Skousen's father unexpectedly died from lung cancer in 1964 despite never having smoked.

Skousen served as an LDS missionary in Finland from 1965 to 1967.

== Studies ==
Skousen received his B.A. degree from BYU, with a major in English and a minor in mathematics. Skousen went on to study linguistics at the University of Illinois at Urbana-Champaign, earning his Ph.D. degree there in 1972.

== Career ==
Skousen was an assistant professor of linguistics at the University of Texas at Austin from the earning of his PhD until 1979, when he joined the faculty of BYU. He was also a visiting professor at the University of California, San Diego in 1981, a Fulbright lecturer at the University of Tampere in Finland in 1982, and a research fellow at the Max Planck Institute for Psycholinguistics in Nijmegen, Netherlands, in 2001. In 1999, BYU presented him the Karl G. Maeser Excellence in Research and Creative Arts Awards.

Since 1999, Skousen has served as the president of the Utah Association of Scholars, an affiliate of the National Association of Scholars. He has also been associate editor of the Journal of Quantitative Linguistics since 2003.

== Personal life ==
Having served his mission in Finland, Skousen is fluent in Finnish.

Skousen married Sirkku Unelma Härkönen in 1968. They have seven children and live in Orem, Utah.

== Works ==
=== Books ===
- Skousen, Royal (1975). Substantive Evidence in Phonology: The Evidence From Finnish and French. The Hague: Mouton.
- —— (1989). Analogical Modeling of Language. Dordrecht; Boston: Kluwer Academic Publishers. ISBN 0-7923-0517-5.
- —— (1992). Analogy and Structure. Dordrecht; Boston; Norwell, MA: Kluwer Academic Publishers. ISBN 0-7923-1935-4.
- —— (2001). The Original Manuscript of the Book of Mormon: Typographical Facsimile of the Extant Text. Critical Text of the Book of Mormon. Vol. 1. Provo, Utah: Foundation for Ancient Research and Mormon Studies, Brigham Young University. ISBN 0-934893-04-7.
- —— (2001). The Printer's Manuscript of the Book of Mormon: Typographical Facsimile of the Entire Text in Two Parts. Critical Text of the Book of Mormon. Vol. 2. Provo, Utah: Foundation for Ancient Research and Mormon Studies, Brigham Young University. ISBN 0-934893-05-5. 2 vols.
- ——; Deryle Lonsdale; Dilworth B. Parkinson (2002). Analogical Modeling: An Exemplar-Based Approach to Language. Amsterdam; Philadelphia: John Benjamins. ISBN 1-58811-302-7.
- —— (August 2004). Analysis of Textual Variants of the Book of Mormon. Critical Text of the Book of Mormon. Vol. 4. Provo, Utah: Foundation for Ancient Research and Mormon Studies, Brigham Young University. ISBN 0-934893-07-1. 6 vols.
- —— (2009). The Book of Mormon: The Earliest Text. New Haven, CT: Yale University Press. ISBN 978-0-300-14218-1.

=== Articles and papers ===
- Skousen, Royal (Fall 1986). "Through a Glass Darkly: Trying to Understand the Scriptures". BYU Studies. 26 (4): 3–20.
- —— (Summer 1988). "[Book review of] The Book of Isaiah: A New Translation With Interpretive Keys From the Book of Mormon, by Avraham Gileadi". BYU Studies. 28 (3): 124–127.
- —— (Winter 1990). "Towards a Critical Edition of the Book of Mormon". BYU Studies. 30 (1): 41–69.
- —— (1992). "Book of Mormon Editions (1830-1981)". In Daniel H. Ludlow (ed.). Encyclopedia of Mormonism. Vol. 1. New York: Macmillan. ISBN 0-02-879600-4.
- —— (1992). "Book of Mormon Manuscripts". In Daniel H. Ludlow (ed.). Encyclopedia of Mormonism. Vol. 1. New York: Macmillan. ISBN 0-02-879600-4.
- —— (1992). "The Original Book of Mormon Transcript". In John W. Welch (ed.). Reexploring the Book of Mormon: The F.A.R.M.S. Updates. Salt Lake City, Utah: Deseret Book. ISBN 0-87579-600-1.
- —— (May 1992). "Piecing Together the Original Manuscript". BYU Today. 46 (3): 18–24.
- —— (1994). "Textual Analysis of Zenos's Allegory of the Olive Tree". In Stephen D. Ricks; John W. Welch (eds.). The Allegory of the Olive Tree: The Olive, The Bible, and Jacob 5. Salt Lake City, Utah: Deseret Book. pp. 28–39. ISBN 0-87579-767-9.
- —— (1994). "The Original Language of the Book of Mormon: Upstate New York Dialect, King James English, or Hebrew?". Journal of Book of Mormon Studies. 3 (1): 28–39. JSTOR 44758652. S2CID 162724231.
- —— (1994). "Critical Methodology and the Text of the Book of Mormon". Review of Books on the Book of Mormon. 6 (1): 121–144. doi:10.2307/44796955. JSTOR 44796955. S2CID 55305227.
- —— (1994). "The Bible II". Review of Books on the Book of Mormon. 6 (2): 1–2. doi:10.2307/44796970. JSTOR 44796970.
- —— (1997). "Translating the Book of Mormon: Evidence from the Original Manuscript". In Noel B. Reynolds (ed.). Book of Mormon Authorship Revisited: The Evidence for Ancient Origins. Provo, Utah: Foundation for Ancient Research and Mormon Studies. ISBN 0-934893-25-X.
- —— (1998). "Joseph Smith's Translation of the Book of Mormon: Evidence for Tight Control of the Text". Journal of Book of Mormon Studies. 7 (1): 22–31. JSTOR 44759916. S2CID 164546481.
- —— (2000). "John Gilbert's 1892 Account of the 1830 Printing of the Book of Mormon". In Stephen D. Ricks; Donald W. Parry; Andrew H. Hedges (eds.). The Disciple as Witness: Essays on Latter-day Saint History and Doctrine in Honor of Richard Lloyd Anderson. Provo, Utah: Foundation for Ancient Research and Mormon Studies at Brigham Young University. ISBN 0-934893-45-4.
- —— (2000). "Introducing the Dead Sea Scrolls to an LDS Audience". FARMS Review of Books. 12 (2): 441–44. doi:10.2307/44797082. JSTOR 44797082. S2CID 193638588.
- —— (2001). "Was the Path Nephi Saw "Strait and Narrow" or "Straight and Narrow"?". Journal of Book of Mormon Studies. 10 (2): 30–33. JSTOR 10.5406/jbookmormstud.10.2.0030. S2CID 127970445.
- —— (2002). "'Scourged' vs. 'Scorched' in Mosiah 17:13". Insights. 22 (3): 2–3.
- —— (2004). "The Pleading Bar of God". Insights. 24 (4): 2–3.
- —— (2005). "The Earliest Textual Sources for Joseph Smith's 'New Translation' of the King James Bible". FARMS Review. 17 (2): 451–70. doi:10.5406/farmsreview.17.2.0451. S2CID 164523829.
- —— (2005). "The Archaic Vocabulary of the Book of Mormon". Insights. 25 (5): 2–6.
- —— (2006). "Conjectural Emendation in the Book of Mormon". FARMS Review. 18 (1): 187–231. doi:10.5406/farmsreview.18.1.0187.
- —— (2006). "Translating and Printing the Book of Mormon". Oliver Cowdery: Scribe, Elder, Witness. Provo, Utah: Neal A. Maxwell Institute for Religious Scholarship. pp. 75–122. ISBN 0-8425-2661-7.
