= John Gee =

American historian

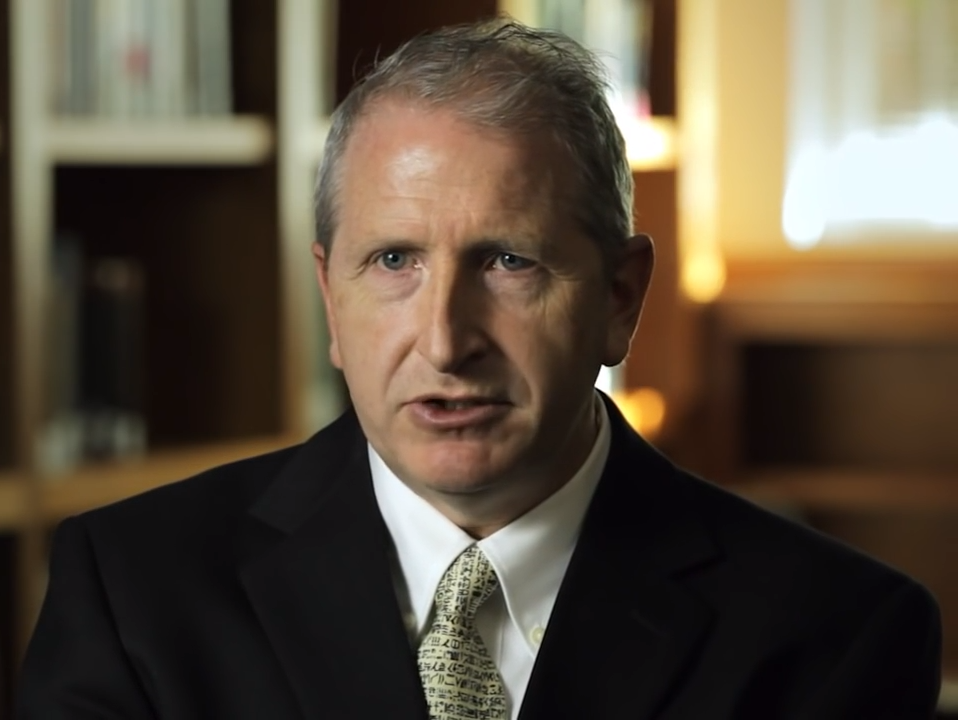
- Born: 1964 (age 61–62)

Academic background
- Education: Brigham Young University; University of California, Berkeley; Yale University
- Thesis: The requirements of ritual purity in ancient Egypt

Academic work
- Discipline: Egyptology; Mormon apologetics
- Institutions: Brigham Young University

John Laurence Gee (born 1964) is an American Latter-day Saint scholar, apologist and an Egyptologist. He currently teaches at Brigham Young University (BYU) and serves in the Department of Near Eastern Languages. He is known for his writings in support of the Book of Abraham.

== Life ==
=== Education ===
Gee graduated from BYU in 1988. Later, he became a graduate student in Near Eastern Studies at the University of California, Berkeley and received his M.A. in Near Eastern Studies in 1991. He earned his Ph.D. in Egyptology at Yale University in 1998, completing his dissertation on ancient Egyptian ritual purity, entitled: The requirements of ritual purity in ancient Egypt.

=== Teaching ===
Gee was the William "Bill" Gay Research Professor of Egyptology at the Neal A. Maxwell Institute for Religious Scholarship at BYU.

=== Editorial work ===
In this role, he is an editor for the Studies in the Book of Abraham series and a member of the editorial board of the Eastern Christian Texts series.

Gee has been involved with various professional societies. He is editor of the Journal of the Society for the Study of Egyptian Antiquities, and has served on the Society's committees and board of trustees. He was also on the board of directors for the Aziz S. Atiya Fund for Coptic Studies at the University of Utah. He has participated in the International Association for Coptic Studies, the Society of Biblical Literature, the American Research Center in Egypt, and the David M. Kennedy Center for International Studies.

Gee has written an overview of Coptic literature. In May 2008 Gee gave a presentation on the early conversion to Christianity in Egypt at the Coptic Church Centre in London.

== Mormon studies ==
Gee is a member of the Church of Jesus Christ of Latter-day Saints (LDS Church), which believes Joseph Smith divinely translated the Book of Abraham from Egyptian papyrus in the 19th century. Because of his expertise in Near Eastern studies and Egyptology, Gee is highly visible in the debate over the authenticity of the Book of Abraham. His interest in these issues led to his involvement with the Foundation for Ancient Research and Mormon Studies (FARMS) at BYU since the late 1980s. He has also presented on the Joseph Smith Papyri to the Foundation for Apologetic Information & Research (FAIR).

In 2010 Gee made a presentation with Louis C. Midgley at the BYU Mormon Media Studies Symposium reporting on their study into the effect of the tendency of Evangelical Christians to attack the right of other groups to call themselves Christians and how this affected Mitt Romney's presidential campaign.

== Criticism of scholarship ==
One of Gee's former Yale professors, Robert K. Ritner, later publicly criticized some of Gee's interpretations of the Joseph Smith Papyri as well as his failure to share drafts of his work with Ritner, as his other students have.

One of Gee's former co-authors, fellow professors at BYU, and editor of the Joseph Smith Papers project, Brian Hauglid, is also critical of Gee's interpretations of the Joseph Smith Papyri. In 2018, Hauglid wrote, "I no longer agree with Gee or Mulhestein. I find their apologetic "scholarship" on the BoA abhorrent."

== Saving Faith controversy ==
Gee's 2020 book Saving Faith: How Families Protect, Sustain, and Encourage Faith caused immediate controversy with its suggestion that sexual abuse might be a possible factor in homosexual attraction. Multiple reviewers noted that this and other claims were outside Gee's realm of expertise and asserted that he misinterpreted data to arrive at his conclusions. The book was pulled by its publisher.

== Works ==
Theses

- Gee, John (1991). Notes on the Sons of Horus (Masters thesis). Provo, UT: FARMS.
- —— (1998). The Requirements of Ritual Purity in Ancient Egypt (Doctoral dissertation). New Haven, CT: Yale University.

Papers

- Gee, John (1987). Creation: The Book of Abraham, Science, and the Ancient Near East. [University scholar project]. Provo, UT: Brigham Young University.
- —— (1999). "A History of the Joseph Smith Papyri and Book of Abraham". FARMS. Provo, UT.
- —— (1999). "The Ancient Owners of the Joseph Smith Papyri". BYU Studies Quarterly. 61 (4). Provo, UT: FARMS.
- —— (2004). "'There Needs No Ghost, My Lord, Come from the Grave to Tell Us This': Dreams and Angels in Ancient Egypt" (PDF). Egyptology and Ancient Israel. Society of Biblical Literature.

Articles

- Gee, John (September 1991). "References to Abraham Found in Two Egyptian Texts". Insights: An Ancient Window. Provo, UT: FARMS.
- —— (Fall 1992). "Limhi in the Library". Journal of Book of Mormon Studies. 1 (1). Provo, UT: FARMS: 54–66. JSTOR 44758621.
- —— (Fall 1992). "A Note on the Name of Nephi". Journal of Book of Mormon Studies. 1 (1). Provo, UT: FARMS: 189–191. JSTOR 44758629.
- —— (July 1992). "Abraham in Ancient Egyptian Texts". Ensign: 60.
- —— (1992). "A Tragedy of Errors". Review of Books on the Book of Mormon. 4. Provo, UT: FARMS: 93–119. doi:10.2307/44796510. JSTOR 44796510.
- —— (1995). "Abracadabra, Isaac and Jacob". Review of Books on the Book of Mormon. 7 (1). Provo, UT: FARMS: 19–84. doi:10.2307/44796993. JSTOR 44796993.
- —— (1996). "Two Notes on Egyptian Script". Journal of Book of Mormon Studies. 5 (1). Provo, UT: FARMS: 162–176. JSTOR 44747537.
- —— (1996). "Telling the Story of the Joseph Smith Papyri". Review of Books on the Book of Mormon. 8 (2). Provo, UT: FARMS: 46–59. doi:10.2307/44792716. JSTOR 44792716.
- —— (1997). "New and Old Light on Shawabtis from Mesoamerica". Journal of Book of Mormon Studies. 6 (1). Provo, UT: FARMS: 64–69. JSTOR 44759814.
- —— (1997). "Another Note on the Three Days of Darkness". Journal of Book of Mormon Studies. 6 (2). Provo, UT: FARMS: 235–44. JSTOR 44758829.
- —— (1998). "'Choose the Things That Please Me': On the Selection of the Isaiah Sections in the Book of Mormon". In Donald W. Parry; John W. Welch (eds.). Isaiah in the Book of Mormon. Provo, Utah: FARMS. ISBN 0-934893-29-2.
- —— (February 1999). "Ancient Manuscripts Fit Book of Mormon Pattern". Insights. Provo, UT: FARMS.
- —— (1999). "The Keeper of the Gate". In Donald W. Parry, Stephen D. Ricks (ed.). The Temple in Time and Eternity. Provo, Utah: FARMS. ISBN 0-934893-46-2.
- —— (2000). "Eyewitness, Hearsay, and Physical Evidence of the Joseph Smith Papyri". In Stephen D. Ricks; Donald W. Parry; Andrew H. Hedges (eds.). The Disciple as Witness: Essays on Latter-day Saint History and Doctrine in Honor of Richard Lloyd Anderson. Provo, Utah: FARMS. ISBN 0-934893-45-4.
- ——; John A. Tvedtnes; Matthew Roper (2000). "Book of Mormon Names Attested in Ancient Hebrew Inscriptions". Journal of Book of Mormon Studies. 9 (1): 40–51. JSTOR 44758905. Archived from the original on December 23, 2008.
- ——; Bezalel Porten (2001). "Aramaic Funerary Practices in Egypt". In P.M. Michèle Daviau; John W. Wevers; Michael Weigl (eds.). The World of the Aramaeans. Sheffield, England: Sheffield Academic Press. ISBN 1-84127-179-9.
- —— (2001). "Epigraphic Considerations on Janne Sjodahl's Experiment with Nephite Writing". Journal of Book of Mormon Studies. 10 (1): 25. JSTOR 10.5406/jbookmormstud.10.1.0025. Archived from the original on August 8, 2007.
- ——; Stephen D. Ricks (2001). "Historical Plausibility: Historicity of the Book of Abraham as a Case Study". In Paul Y. Hoskisson (ed.). Historicity and the Latter-day Saint Scriptures. Provo, Utah: Religious Studies Center, Brigham Young University. ISBN 1-57734-928-8.
- —— (2001). "Towards an Interpretation of Hypocephali". "Le lotus qui sort du terre": Mélanges offerts à Edith Varga. Bulletin du Musée Hongrois des Beaux-Arts Supplément-2001. Budapest: Musée Hongrois des Beaux-Arts. pp. 325–34.
- —— (2002). "The Wrong Type of Book". In Donald W. Parry; Daniel C. Peterson; John W. Welch (eds.). Echoes and Evidences of the Book of Mormon. Provo, Utah: FARMS, Brigham Young University. ISBN 0-934893-72-1.
- ——; Roper, Matthew (2003). "I Did Liken All Scriptures Unto Us: Early Nephite Understandings of Isaiah and Implications for 'Others' in the Land". The Fulness of the Gospel: Foundational Teachings from the Book of Mormon; The 32nd Annual Sidney B. Sperry Symposium. Salt Lake City: Deseret Book.
- —— (2003). "The Earliest Example of ph-ntr?". Göttinger Miszellen. 194: 25–27.
- —— (2004). "Prophets, Initiation and the Egyptian Temple". Journal of the Society for the Study of Egyptian Antiquities. 31: 97–107.
- —— (2004). "Egyptian Society During the Twenty-sixth Dynasty". In John W. Welch; David Rolph Seely; JoAnn H. Seely (eds.). Glimpses of Lehi's Jerusalem. Provo, Utah: FARMS. ISBN 0-934893-74-8.
- —— (2004). "A Seething Pot in the North: International Affairs Leading Up to Lehi's Day". In John W. Welch; David Rolph Seely; JoAnn H. Seely (eds.). Glimpses of Lehi's Jerusalem. Provo, Utah: FARMS. ISBN 0-934893-74-8.
- —— (2004). "S_{3} mi nn: A Temporary Conclusion". Göttinger Miszellen. 202: 55–58.
- —— (2004). "Trial Marriage in Ancient Egypt? P. Louvre E 7846 Reconsidered". In Friedrich Hoffmann; Günther Vittmann (eds.). Res severa verum gaudium. Leuven, Belgium: Peeters Publishers. pp. 223–31.
- —— (2004). "Notes on the Egyptian Motifs in Mozart's Magic Flute". BYU Studies. 43 (3): 149–160.
- —— (June 2004). "Gertoux, Gérard. The Name of God Y.EH.OW.AH Which is Pronounced as It Is Written I_EH_OU_AH. Lanham, Md.: University Press of America, 2002. Pp. 328. Paper. $47.00. ISBN 0761822046". Review of Biblical Literature. Society of Biblical Literature. ISSN 1099-0321.
- —— (2005). "The Corruption of Scripture in Early Christianity". In Noel B. Reynolds (ed.). Early Christians in Disarray: Contemporary LDS Perspectives on the Christian Apostasy. Provo, Utah: FARMS. ISBN 978-0-934893-02-2.
- —— (2006). "A New Look at the ʿnḫ pꜣ by Formula". In Hedvig Györy (ed.). Aegyptus et Pannonia III. Budapest: MEBT-OEB.
- —— (2006). "Non-round Hypocephali". In Hedvig Györy (ed.). Aegyptus et Pannonia III. Budapest: MEBT-OEB.
- —— (March 2006). "Context Matters". Review of Biblical Literature. Review of The "Mithras Liturgy": Text, Translation and Commentary, by Hans Dieter Betz.
- —— (2007). "New Light on the Joseph Smith Papyri". FARMS Review. 19 (2): 245–260. doi:10.5406/farmsreview.19.2.0245.
- —— (2008). "The Great and Last Sacrifice". In Richard Neitzel Holzapfel; Frank F. Judd Jr.; Thomas A. Wayment (eds.). "Behold the Lamb of God": An Easter Celebration. Provo, Utah: Religious Studies Center, Brigham Young University. ISBN 978-0-8425-2693-7.
- —— (2008). "Love and Marriage in the Ancient World: An Historical Corrective". Journal of the Society for the Study of Egyptian Antiquities. 35.
- —— (2008). "On the Practice of Sealing in the Book of the Dead and the Coffin Texts". Journal of the Society for the Study of Egyptian Antiquities. 35.
- ——; Kerry Muhlestein (2009). "Egyptian Middle Kingdom Contexts for Human Sacrifice". Studies in the Bible and Antiquity. 1 (1).
- —— (2010). "James, First and Second Peter, and Jude: Epistles of Persecution". In Richard Neitzel Holzapfel; Thomas A. Wayment (eds.). The Life and Teachings of the New Testament Apostles: From the Day of Pentecost to the Apocalypse. Salt Lake City: Deseret Book. ISBN 978-1-60641-824-6.
- ——; Kerry Muhlestein (2011). "An Egyptian Context for the Sacrifice of Abraham". Journal of the Book of Mormon and Other Restoration Scripture. 20 (2): 70–77. JSTOR 10.5406/jbookmormotheres.20.2.0070.

Books

- Gee, John (2000). A Guide to the Joseph Smith Papyri. Provo, Utah: FARMS. ISBN 0-934893-54-3.
- ——; John A. Tvedtnes; Brian M. Hauglid (2001). Traditions About the Early Life of Abraham. Studies in the Book of Abraham; No. 1. Provo, Utah: FARMS. ISBN 0-934893-59-4.
- ——; Hauglid, Brian M. (2005). Astronomy, Papyrus, and Covenant. Studies in the Book of Abraham; No. 3. Provo, Utah: FARMS. ISBN 0-934893-76-4.
- Nibley, Hugh (2005). ——; Rhodes, Michael D. (eds.). The Message of the Joseph Smith Papyri: An Egyptian Endowment (2nd ed.). Provo, Utah: FARMS. ISBN 1-59038-539-X.
- Gee, John (2017). An Introduction to the Book of Abraham. BYU Religious Studies Center.
- Gee, John (2020). Saving Faith: How Families Protect, Sustain, and Encourage Faith. BYU Religious Studies Center.

== See also ==
- Foundation for Ancient Research and Mormon Studies (FARMS)
