= Todd Compton =

American historian

Todd Merlin Compton (born 1952) is an American historian in the fields of Mormon history and classics. Compton is a respected authority on the plural wives of the LDS Church founder, Joseph Smith.

== Biographical background ==
Compton is a member of the Church of Jesus Christ of Latter-day Saints who lived for a number of years in Santa Monica, California. He has served an LDS mission to Ireland. He studied violin with Richard Nibley and has played electric violin with singer-songwriter Mark Davis. In 1982 he completed a master's degree from Brigham Young University. He later received a Ph.D. from UCLA in classics (concentrating on Greek and Indo-European mythology) which he taught for a year at USC. He also taught at UCLA and California State University, Northridge. He has been an independent researcher since 1993, drawing a regular income by working as an ADS specialist for a law office.

Compton began his serious work in Mormon history as a visiting fellow at the Huntington Library studying the journals of Eliza R. Snow. He found that his classics background helped his Mormon history work by teaching him respect for these primary documents. While researching, and trying to note people identified in Snow's journals, Compton found that he needed a good list of Joseph Smith's plural wives. Not finding one, he began researching his own list, which eventually grew into his 1997 book, In Sacred Loneliness: The Plural Wives of Joseph Smith.

== Publications ==
Compton's notable works include In Sacred Loneliness: The Plural Wives of Joseph Smith, which was awarded the Best Book Award from both the John Whitmer Historical Association and the Mormon History Association. The Mormon History Association also awarded him the 2002 Best Documentary Award for his and Charles Hatch's book A Widow's Tale: The 1884–1886 Diary of Helen Mar Kimball Whitney, and the 1996 Award of Excellence for his article "A Trajectory of Plurality: An Overview of Joseph Smith's Thirty Three Plural Wives".

Compton has contributed publications to the Foundation for Ancient Research and Mormon Studies (FARMS), including articles in FARMS Review of Books and Journal of Book of Mormon Studies and as an editor of the 1987 edition of Hugh Nibley's Mormonism and Early Christianity. He has also been published in The Encyclopedia of Mormonism, Women and Authority: Re-emerging Mormon Feminism, American Journal of Philology, Dialogue: A Journal of Mormon Thought, Sunstone Magazine, Classical Quarterly, and the Journal of Popular Culture.

From 1993–1998, Compton served on the editorial board for the periodical Dialogue: A Journal of Mormon Thought. Starting in 2004, Compton returned to work at Dialogue, this time as the editorial staff's History Editor. Compton has also served on the Board of Editors for the Journal of Mormon History since 2000.

Compton's biography of Jacob Hamblin, A Frontier Life: Jacob Hamblin, Explorer and Indian Missionary, was published by the University of Utah Press in September, 2013. It has received the Juanita Brooks Prize in Mormon Studies, the Mormon History Association's Best Biography award, the John Whitmer Historical Association's Best Biography award, The Evans Biography Award from the Mountain West Center for Regional Studies, and the Francis Armstrong Madsen Best Utah History Book Award from the Utah State Historical Society. His article, "'In & through the roughefist country it has ever been my lot to travel'": Jacob Hamblin's 1858 Expedition Across the Colorado," (Utah Historical Quarterly, Winter 2012) received the Dale L. Morgan Award from the Utah State Historical Society.

In May 2017, through his company Pahreah Press, Compton published a book on the songwriting of the Beatles, titled Who Wrote the Beatle Songs? A History of Lennon-McCartney.

== Works ==
Books

- Nibley, Hugh W. (1987). Todd Compton; Stephen D. Ricks (eds.). Mormonism and Early Christianity. The Collected Works of Hugh Nibley. Vol. 4. Salt Lake City: Foundation for Ancient Research and Mormon Studies. ISBN 0-87579-127-1.
- Compton, Todd M. (1997). In Sacred Loneliness: The Plural Wives of Joseph Smith. Salt Lake City: Signature Books. ISBN 1-56085-085-X.
- Whitney, Helen Mar (2003). Todd M. Compton; Charles M. Hatch (eds.). A Widow's Tale: The 1884-1896 Diary of Helen Mar Whitney. Life Writings of Frontier Women. Vol. 6. Logan, Utah: Utah State University Press. ISBN 0-87421-557-9.
- Compton, Todd M. (2006). Victim of The Muses: Poet as Scapegoat, Warrior and Hero in Greco-Roman and Indo-European Myth and History. Washington, D.C.: Center for Hellenic Studies, Trustees for Harvard University. ISBN 0-674-01958-X.
- Gentry, Leland Homer; Todd M. Compton (2011). Fire and Sword: A History of the Latter-day Saints in Northern Missouri, 1836-39. Salt Lake City, Utah: Greg Kofford Books. ISBN 978-1-58958-120-3.
- Compton, Todd M. (2013). A Frontier Life: Jacob Hamblin, Explorer and Indian Missionary. Salt Lake City, Utah: University of Utah Press.
- Compton, Todd M. (2017). Who Wrote the Beatle Songs? A History of Lennon-McCartney. San Jose, California: Pahreah Press. ISBN 978-0-9988997-0-1.
- Compton, Todd M. (2018). The Ethics of the Uncanny: An Anthology of Great Ghost Stories. San Jose, California: Pahreah Press. ISBN 978-0-9988997-3-2.
- Compton, Todd M. (2022). In Sacred Loneliness: The Documents. Salt Lake City, Utah: Signature Books.

Chapters

- Compton, Todd M. (1992). "Apostasy". In Daniel H. Ludlow (ed.). Encyclopedia of Mormonism. Vol. 1. New York: Macmillan. pp. 56–58. ISBN 0-02-879600-4.
- Compton, Todd M. (1992). "Symbolism". In Daniel H. Ludlow (ed.). Encyclopedia of Mormonism. Vol. 3. New York: Macmillan. pp. 1428–30. ISBN 0-02-879602-0.
- Compton, Todd M. (1996). "Fawn Brodie on Joseph Smith's Plural Wives and Polygamy: A Critical View". In Newell G. Bringhurst (ed.). Reconsidering 'No Man Knows My History': Fawn M. Brodie and Joseph Smith in Retrospect. Logan: Utah State University Press. ISBN 0-87421-214-6.
- Compton, Todd M. (2005). "Foreword". In Anderson, Devery S.; Bergera, Gary James (eds.). Joseph Smith's Quorum of the Anointed, 1842-1845. Salt Lake City: Signature Books. ISBN 1-56085-186-4. OCLC 57965858.
- Compton, Todd M. (2020). "Plural Accidents: Writing In Sacred Loneliness". In Joseph W. Geisner (ed.). Writing Mormon History: Historians and Their Books. Salt Lake City: Signature Books. ISBN 9781560852810.

Articles and papers

- Compton, Todd M. (1982). "The Homeric roots of Virgil's Elysium, and Notes on the manuscript Montpellier 360 of Sallust". Master's thesis. Provo, UT: Dept. of Humanities, Classics, and Comparative Literature, Brigham Young University.
- Compton, Todd M. (1988). "The Exile of the Poet: Bardic Expulsion and Death in the Archaic Greek and Indo-European Traditions". Doctoral thesis. University of California, Los Angeles.
- Compton, Todd M. (1988). "McCartney or Lennon?: Beatle Myths and the Composing of the Lennon-McCartney Songs". The Journal of Popular Culture. 22 (2): 99–131. doi:10.1111/j.0022-3840.1988.2202_99.x.
- Compton, Todd M. (1990). "What Are the Tornoi in Philebus 51C?". The Classical Quarterly. 40 (2): 549–552. doi:10.1017/S0009838800043160. JSTOR 639118. S2CID 170703800.
- Compton, Todd M. (Autumn 1990). "The Trial of the Satirist: Poetic Vitae (Aesop, Archilochus, Homer) as Background for Plato's Apology". American Journal of Philology. 111 (3): 330–347. doi:10.2307/295155. JSTOR 295155.
- Compton, Todd M. (1990). "The Handclasp and Embrace as Tokens of Recognition". In John M. Lundquist, Stephen D. Ricks (ed.). By Study and Also by Faith, Volume 1: Essays in Honor of Hugh W. Nibley on the Occasion of His Eightieth Birthday. Salt Lake City: Foundation for Ancient Research and Mormon Studies. pp. 611–42. ISBN 0-87579-339-8.
- Compton, Todd M. (June 1991). "Counter-Hierarchical Revelation" (PDF). Sunstone. 15 (2): 34–41.
- Compton, Todd M. (1992). "Non-Hierarchical Revelation". In Maxine Hanks (ed.). Women and Authority: Re-emerging Mormon Feminism. Salt Lake City: Signature Books. ISBN 1-56085-014-0.
- Compton, Todd M. (Spring 1993). "The Spirituality of the Outcast in the Book of Mormon". Journal of Book of Mormon Studies. 2 (1): 139–60. JSTOR 44758643. S2CID 193680485.
- Compton, Todd M. (Spring 1996). "Fanny Alger Smith Custer, Mormonism's First Plural Wife?". Journal of Mormon History. 22 (1): 172–205. Archived from the original on December 21, 2008.
- Compton, Todd M. (Summer 1996). "A Trajectory of Plurality: An Overview of Joseph Smith's Thirty-three Plural Wives". Dialogue: A Journal of Mormon Thought. 29 (2): 1–38. doi:10.2307/45226184. JSTOR 45226184. S2CID 254388739.
- Compton, Todd M. (September 1996). "Christian Scholarship and the Book of Mormon" (PDF). Sunstone. 20 (3): 74–81.
- Compton, Todd M. (Winter 1996). "Heaven and Hell: The Parable of the Loving Father and the Judgmental Son". Dialogue: A Journal of Mormon Thought. 29 (4): 31–44. doi:10.2307/45228290. JSTOR 45228290. S2CID 254386966.
- Compton, Todd M. (1999). "In Sacred Loneliness: An Introduction and Some RLDS Portraits". John Whitmer Historical Association Journal. 19: 62–78.
- Compton, Todd M. (March 1999). "Thoughts on the Possibility of an Open Temple" (PDF). Sunstone. 23 (1): 42–9.
- Compton, Todd M. (Fall 1999). ""Remember Me in My Affliction": Louisa Beaman Young and Eliza R. Snow Letters, 1849". Journal of Mormon History. 25 (2): 46–69.
- Compton, Todd M. (Winter 1999). "Was Jesus a Feminist?". Dialogue: A Journal of Mormon Thought. 32 (4): 1–17. doi:10.2307/45226633. JSTOR 45226633. S2CID 254318903.
- Compton, Todd M. (Summer 2001). "The Spiritual Roots of the Democratic Party: Why I Am a Mormon Democrat". Sunstone Symposium.
- Compton, Todd M. (Winter 2002). "John Willard Young, Brigham Young, and the Development of Presidential Succession in the LDS Church". Dialogue: A Journal of Mormon Thought. 35 (4): 111–34. doi:10.2307/45226902. JSTOR 45226902. S2CID 254404200.
- Compton, Todd M. (Fall 2003). ""Kingdom of Priests": Priesthood, Temple, and Women in the Old Testament and in the Restoration". Dialogue: A Journal of Mormon Thought. 36 (3): 41–59. doi:10.2307/45227107. JSTOR 45227107. S2CID 254398613.
- Compton, Todd M. (2004). "The New Mormon Women's History". In Newell G. Bringhurst; Lavina Fielding Anderson (eds.). Excavating Mormon Pasts: The New Historiography of the Last Half Century. Salt Lake City: Greg Kofford Books. pp. 273–302. ISBN 1-58958-091-5.
- Compton, Todd M. (Summer 2007). "Civilizing the Ragged Edge: The Wives of Jacob Hamblin". Journal of Mormon History. 33 (2): 155–98.
- Compton, Todd M. (Spring 2008). "A Playwright with a Passion for Unvarnished Depictions: An Interview with Tom Rogers" (PDF). Dialogue: A Journal of Mormon Thought. 41 (1): 67–90. doi:10.5406/dialjmormthou.41.1.0067. S2CID 171495284.
- Compton, Todd M. (Spring 2009). "Becoming a "Messenger of Peace": Jacob Hamblin in Tooele". Dialogue: A Journal of Mormon Thought. 42 (1): 1–29. doi:10.5406/dialjmormthou.42.1.0001. S2CID 171754115.
- Compton, Todd M. (Spring 2009). "The Big Washout: The 1862 Flood in Santa Clara". Utah Historical Quarterly. 77 (2): 108–125. doi:10.2307/45063184. JSTOR 45063184. S2CID 254443729.
- Compton, Todd M. (2010). "Early Marriage in the New England and Northeastern States, and in Mormon Polygamy: What Was the Norm?". In Newell G. Bringhurst; Craig L. Foster (eds.). The Persistence of Polygamy: Joseph Smith and the Origins of Mormon Polygamy. Independence, Missouri: John Whitmer Books. ISBN 978-1-934901-13-7.
- Compton, Todd M. (Winter 2012). ""In & through the roughefist country it has ever been my lot to travel": Jacob Hamblin's 1858 Expedition Across the Colorado". Utah Historical Quarterly. 80 (1): 4–21. doi:10.2307/45063375. JSTOR 45063375. S2CID 254434222.
- Compton, Todd M. (May 2012). "Mitt Romney's Polygamous Heritage". Personal Website.
- Compton, Todd M. (2012). "'The Lord Alone Knows How Deep the Sorrow Has Been in My Heart' MARY MINERVA DART JUDD (1838-1909)". In Richard E. Turley; Brittany A. Chapman (eds.). Women of Faith in the Latter Days, Volume Two, 1821-1845. Salt Lake City: Deseret Book. pp. 167–82.
- Compton, Todd M. (Summer 2014). "Conquering the Black Ridge: The Communitarian Road in Pioneer Utah". Utah Historical Quarterly. 82 (3): 220–32. doi:10.2307/45063066. JSTOR 45063066. S2CID 254438624.
- Compton, Todd M. (2015). Slickrock Missions: Jacob Hamblin's Communitarian Expeditions across the Colorado (PDF). St. George, Utah: Dixie State University.
- Compton, Todd M. (2015). "Infinite Canons: A Few Axioms and Questions, and in Addition, a Proposed Definition". Personal Website.
- Compton, Todd M. (2021). "Ganado Mucho and the Mormons: Seeking for Peace in Troubled Times". John Whitmer Historical Association Journal. 41: 86–110.
