= Noel B. Reynolds =

American political scientist and academic

- Born: 1942 (age 83–84); Los Angeles, California
- Education: Brigham Young University, Harvard University
- Spouse: Sydney S. Reynolds

Noel Beldon Reynolds (born 1942) is an American political scientist and an emeritus professor of political science at Brigham Young University (BYU), where he has also served as an associate academic vice president and as director for the Foundation for Ancient Research and Mormon Studies (FARMS). He was a member of the BYU faculty from 1970 to 2011. He has also written widely on the theology of the Church of Jesus Christ of Latter-day Saints (LDS Church), of which he is a member.

== Early life ==
Reynolds was born in Los Angeles, California. He grew up near Cody, Wyoming where his parents had undertaken a homestead in 1948. Reynolds served as an LDS Church missionary in Uruguay, Argentina, and Paraguay from 1961 to 1964. Reynolds earned a bachelor's degree at BYU, followed by M.A. and Ph.D. degrees from Harvard University.

== Career ==
Reynolds has been a visiting professor at Harvard Law School, Edinburgh University and Hebrew University of Jerusalem. In the 1970s, Reynolds was chair of BYU's department of philosophy. He also coedited Religious Liberty in Western Thought with Cole Durham Jr., as well as the Encyclopedia of Mormonism, published in 1992 by Macmillan.

Reynolds has published books and articles in several fields, including: legal and political philosophy (22), American founding (8), authorship studies (11), ancient studies and Dead Sea Scrolls (12), Mormon studies (11), and textual studies of the Book of Mormon (45). He is also the author of Interpreting Plato’s Meno and Euthyphro: A Defense of the Literary Approach.

Many of Reynolds' textual studies have been involved in theological explanations of the Book of Mormon and what it teaches. He also has advanced the idea that the Lectures on Faith was not written by Joseph Smith but instead by Sidney Rigdon.

Reynolds edited On the History of the Idea of Law, largely completed before her death by Shirley Robin Letwin, which was published by Cambridge University Press in 2005.

In 2005, BYU and FARMS published Early Christians in Disarray: Conterporary LDS Perspectives on the Apostasy edited by Reynolds.

Reynolds has published in several journals including Interpreter: A Journal of Mormon Scripture, Journal of Mormon History and the Mormon Studies Review.

Among other callings in the LDS Church, Reynolds has served as a bishop and stake president. From 2005 to 2008, Reynolds was president of the church's Florida Fort Lauderdale Mission. During part of this time, the mission included the Bahamas and Turks and Caicos. From 2011 to 2014, he was president of the Mount Timpanogos Utah Temple.

== Personal life ==
Reynolds married Sydney Sharon Reynolds (née Smith) in the Los Angeles Temple. Sydney Reynolds was a member of the LDS Church's Primary General Presidency from 1999 to 2005. They have eleven children.

=== Sydney S. Reynolds ===
Sydney Sharon Smith was born in Idaho Falls, Idaho to J. Alvin Smith and Marguerite Smith (née Rees). She grew up in Burbank, California. At age 16 she entered BYU, where she met Noel B. Reynolds, and they married four years later. She graduated with a bachelor's degree in history and political science from BYU. She was the first counselor to Coleen K. Menlove in the LDS Church's Primary General Presidency from October 1999 until April 2005. She has served in the various LDS Church organizations as a scouting leader, early-morning seminary teacher, and on the steering committee for BYU's annual women's conference. Prior to serving in the Primary General Presidency, Reynolds served for five years as a member of the Primary General Board. From 2005 to 2008, she served with her husband as mission leaders of the church's Florida Fort Lauderdale Mission. From 2011 to 2014, she and her husband served as the temple president and matron of the Mount Timpanogos Utah Temple.

== See also ==
- List of Works by Reynolds - BYU Religious Studies Center
- Biography in "Contributors" section of Donald W. Parry, Daniel C. Peterson and John W. Welch, ed., Echoes and Evidences of the Book of Mormon. (Provo, FARMS, 2002)
- Maxwell Institute biography
- Deseret Morning News 2005 Church Almanac (Salt Lake City, Utah: Deseret Morning News, 2004) p. 108
