= H. Donl Peterson =

Harry Donl Peterson (February 17, 1930 – March 21, 1994) was a religion professor at Brigham Young University (BYU) who primarily studied topics related to the Book of Mormon and Pearl of Great Price.

== Biography ==
Peterson was born and raised in Lehi, Utah. He served a mission in the Western States Mission (headquartered in Denver, Colorado). Peterson received his bachelor's and master's degrees from BYU. He also had a doctorate in education from Washington State University. Starting in 1964 he was a professor at BYU. Prior to that he worked as a seminary and institute teacher and administrator with the Church Educational System. At BYU he directed several travel study programs as well as being involved with the Know Your Religion program.

In the Church of Jesus Christ of Latter-day Saints (LDS Church), Peterson served three times as a bishop and was also president of the BYU 15th Stake. He served in the original branch presidency of the Jerusalem Branch.

Peterson married Mary Lou Schenk in the Salt Lake Temple in 1953. They had six children.

At the age of 64, Peterson died of cancer at his home in Orem, Utah, and was buried in the Orem City Cemetery.

== Publications ==
In addition to his own attributed publications, Peterson also served on LDS Church writing committees that prepared four manuals for the church's Gospel Doctrine classes.

- Peterson, H. Donl (1960). A Study to Determine What Instructional Materials Were Available in the Seminaries of the Church of Jesus Christ of Latter-day Saints, With Recommendations (Masters thesis). Provo, Utah: Dept. of Educational Administration, Brigham Young University.
- —— (1980). "Mummies and Manuscripts: An Update on the Lebolo-Chandler Story". A Sesquicentennial Look at Church History: The Eighth Annual Sidney B. Sperry Symposium. Provo, Utah: Religious Instruction, Brigham Young University.
- —— (1981). "The Nephites and the Law of Moses". The Ninth Annual Sidney B. Sperry Symposium: The Book of Mormon. Provo, Utah: Religious Instruction, Brigham Young University.
- —— (1982). "Moses One: The Divine Prelude to the Holy Bible". The Tenth Annual Sidney B. Sperry Symposium: The Pearl of Great Price. Provo, Utah: Religious Instruction, Brigham Young University.
- —— (1983). Moroni: Ancient Prophet, Modern Messenger. Bountiful, Utah: Horizon Publishers. ISBN 0-88290-227-X. Later published by Deseret Book in 2000 (ISBN 1570087091), and Cedar Fort in 2007 (ISBN 1599551411).
- —— (1987). The Pearl of Great Price: A History and Commentary. Salt Lake City, Utah: Deseret Book. ISBN 0-87579-096-8.
- ——; Tate, Charles D. Jr., eds. (1989). The Pearl of Great Price: Revelations From God. Religious Studies Center Monograph Series. Vol. 14. Provo, Utah: Religious Studies Center, Brigham Young University. ISBN 0-88494-683-5.
- —— (Summer 1991). "Antonio Lebolo: Excavator of the Book of Abraham". BYU Studies. 31 (3): 5–29.
- —— (1992). "Origin of the Book of Abraham". In Daniel H. Ludlow (ed.). Encyclopedia of Mormonism. Vol. 1. New York: Macmillan. ISBN 0-87579-924-8. Archived from the original on 2009-09-25.
- —— (1992). "Translation and Publication of the Book of Abraham". In Daniel H. Ludlow (ed.). Encyclopedia of Mormonism. Vol. 1. New York: Macmillan. ISBN 0-87579-924-8. Archived from the original on 2009-09-25.
- —— (1992). "Book of Mormon Commentaries". In Daniel H. Ludlow (ed.). Encyclopedia of Mormonism. Vol. 1. New York: Macmillan. ISBN 0-87579-924-8. Archived from the original on 2009-09-25.
- —— (1992). "Moroni_{2}". In Daniel H. Ludlow (ed.). Encyclopedia of Mormonism. Vol. 1. New York: Macmillan. ISBN 0-87579-924-8. Archived from the original on 2011-09-18.
- —— (1993). "All the Jews Don't Live in New York City: Jerusalem 1973" (Document). Provo, Utah: H.D. Peterson.
- —— (1995). The Story of the Book of Abraham: Mummies, Manuscripts, and Mormonism. Salt Lake City, Utah: Deseret Book. ISBN 0-87579-846-2. Later published by Cedar Fort in 2008 (ISBN 1599551403).

== Sources ==
- Cedar Fort biography of Peterson
- Biography accompanying his collection of materials related to the Book of Abraham at the L. Tom Perry Special Collections
