= William J. Hamblin =

American historian (1954–2019)

William James Hamblin (1954 – 2019) was a professor of history at Brigham Young University (BYU), and a former board member of the Foundation for Ancient Research and Mormon Studies (FARMS) at BYU.

== Biography ==
Hamblin was raised a member of the Church of Jesus Christ of Latter-day Saints, and he served as a missionary for the Church in Italy from 1973 to 1975.

Hamblin received his bachelor's degree in history from BYU. He did his graduate studies at the University of Michigan (U of M), receiving a Ph.D. in Middle Eastern History in 1985. The title of his dissertation was "The Fatimid Army During the Early Crusades." While a student at the U of M, Hamblin spent a year studying at the Center for Arabic Study in Egypt. Prior to joining the faculty of BYU in 1989, Hamblin worked for the United States Department of Defense and as a history professor at the University of Southern Mississippi. Hamblin also contributed many articles to The International Military Encyclopedia.

In the 1980s, Hamblin published several articles for the role-playing game Call of Cthulhu.

Hamblin taught as a professor in the BYU History Department, and he taught at the BYU Jerusalem Center in 2010. After retiring, Hamblin spent time traveling the world.

From approximately 2011 to 2019, Hamblin co-wrote a Deseret News column on world religions with Daniel C. Peterson.

== Apologetics ==
Hamblin was well-known for his role in Latter-day Saint apologetics. He wrote on archaeology and the Book of Mormon, both in general articles for the Journal of Book of Mormon Studies and in response to criticisms of the historicity of the Book of Mormon.

In 1994 Hamblin responded to an article by Brent Metcalfe in "New Approaches to the Book of Mormon: Explorations in Critical Methodology." In his response, he controversially included an encrypted message spelling out "Metcalfe is Butthead." The message was discovered after his review had gone to press and had to be edited out.

Hamblin also served as an editor for and contributed articles to Interpreter. Peterson, also an editor for Interpreter, called Hamblin "one of the most forceful voices" for "apologetics and explicitly faithful scholarship."

== Writings ==
- Warfare in the Ancient Near East to 1600 BC published by Routledge in 2005.
- Solomon's Temple: Myth and History (Thames and Hudson, 2007) (with David Seely)

== Personal life ==
Hamblin lived in Provo, Utah. He has three children with his ex-wife. The two divorced in 2013. Hamblin remarried to Laura Behling Schroeder in February 2019.

Hamblin died on December 10, 2019. At the time of his death, he was living in Cedar City, Utah, with Laura.
