= Victor L. Ludlow =

Victor Leifson Ludlow (born 1943) is an emeritus religion professor at Brigham Young University (BYU) in Provo, Utah and the author of several books on the Book of Isaiah, most notably Isaiah, Prophet Seer and Poet.

== Biography ==
Ludlow was born in Spanish Fork, Utah but lived in California, Michigan, Indiana, New York City and Provo, Utah while growing up. He is the son of Daniel H. Ludlow. He did his undergraduate studies at BYU. He also served as a missionary for the Church of Jesus Christ of Latter-day Saints (LDS Church) in the Central German Mission of the church (later the Germany Düsseldorf Mission) from 1962 to 1964. Ludlow then received a Danforth Scholarship and studied at Harvard University and Brandeis University, where he received his Ph.D. in Near Eastern and Judaic Studies.

Ludlow was the awarded the distinction of BYU Honors professor of the year in 2002. He is also the translator of the selections from the Book of Mormon into Hebrew. This edition was published in 1982 but banned due to an agreement of no-proselytism between the LDS and the Israeli government.

Ludlow is a scholar on Isaiah. Besides his Isaiah: Prophet Seer and Poet he also wrote Unlocking Isaiah in the Book of Mormon. He also wrote Unlocking the Old Testament and Principles and Practices of the Restored Gospel.

While a BYU professor Ludlow was also the main organizing force behind the annual Passover Seder held at BYU.

Ludlow and his wife Virginia Ann have four sons and two daughters. After V-Ann's death he met and married Cheryl Porter in 2016. Cheryl has two daughters from a previous marriage.

Ludlow has served in many callings in the LDS Church including multiple times as a bishop and as president of the church's Germany Frankfurt Mission from 1983 to 1986.
