= National Association of Professors of Hebrew =

U.S. professional organization

The National Association of Professors of Hebrew (NAPH) is a professional organization for university professors of the Hebrew language in the United States. It was established in 1950.

The association publishes the journals Hebrew Studies (ISSN 0146-4094) and Hebrew Higher Education (ISSN 1058-3351).
