= Michael D. Rhodes =

American Egyptologist

Michael Dennis Rhodes (born 1946) is an associate professor of ancient scripture emeritus, formerly at Brigham Young University (BYU). Rhodes is an Egyptologist who has published a translation of some of the extant Joseph Smith papyri.

Rhodes has a B.A. in Classical Greek from BYU (1970). He also received a B.S. in Electrical Engineering at the Air Force Institute of Technology in 1982 and a M.S. in physics from the University of New Mexico in 1989. He has also studied Egyptology at Johns Hopkins University, the Free University of Berlin and the University of Oxford as well as archaeology at the University of Utah.

Rhodes has published many articles related to the Book of Abraham through the Foundation for Ancient Research and Mormon Studies (FARMS), including some in books edited by John Gee.

== Sources ==
- Rhodes website
- Neal A. Maxwell Institute author page
- Bookfinder list of works by Rhodes
