= Textual criticism of the Old Testament =

Textual criticism of the Old Testament is a form of textual criticism, also known as lower criticism, that studies early versions of the Hebrew Bible and its translations, how it was transmitted and copied, and how the versions of the Old Testament formed over time. The manuscripts studied come in various forms; of parchment scrolls, codices, printed books and occasionally papyri and beaten metal scrolls. Textual criticism aims to document all variants of the text and reconstruct earlier or more original versions of the books, such as specific Masoretic manuscripts.

== Background ==
The twenty four books of the old testament were written and edited over around a thousand year period. Many of the books have older parts and later additions. Over the following millennium the text was painstakingly copied by scribes. Changes crept in from human error such as misreading (due to graphic similarity) or deliberate change (for theological or other reasoning). Many differences between the versions make no difference in the meaning of the word as many words can be written out in full with their vowelisation represented by letters (eg waw or yud) for example לא and לוא called maleh we`ḥaser (lit. full or missing) or alternative words with same meaning such as אנו and אנחנו.

There are several early versions of the Old Testament available to the modern scholar used when studying its textual history. Some of the main ones are the Dead Sea Scrolls, the Samaritan Pentateuch and Masoretic codices. The Septuagint (300 BC) and Peshitta (c. 200 CE) translations are respectively used to reconstruct the Hebrew versions they were been based off. Other fragments include the Nash Papyrus, a burnt of leviticus and many articles from the Cairo Geniza. Torah scrolls and codices from throughout medieval period are used to reconstruct later local versions.

== History ==
=== In Judaism ===
The Tannaic midrash, Sifri reports an instance in the second temple period of comparing three scrolls and following the majority as a method used to conclude which variant is more accurate.

=== In the early church ===
Origen, in his six column work; Hexaple, compared different Greek translations to the original Hebrew. A decade later, Jerome reintroduced the use of the original Hebrew text for translation in the church. In his notes he compared the original Hebrew words with their translations.

== Masoretic Text ==
From approximately the 7th to the 10th century in the Jewish centres (both Rabbinic and Karaite) in the Levant (notably Tiberias) and Babylon, groups of scribe-scholars formed standardized versions of the biblical texts, though evidence of their methods of its development is limited. They presented their conclusions as marginalia in codices or independent documents such as Oklah we-Oklah, containing lists mainly of how words are typically spelled with their exceptions as well as other ways of transmitting exact spelling of words. They presented these conclusions in the actual text in their codices, though discrepancies in maleh we`ḥaser between the lists and text and occasionally between the lists, exist. The main version produced by these scribal schools are Ben Asher including the Aleppo codex and manuscripts part of the same tradition, others are the Ben Naftali and Babylonian traditions.

Meir Abulafia studied mesoretic notes and old documents aiming to get the most accurate mesoretic text (MT) of the pentateuch. His work, Masoret seyag la-Torah together with Or Torah and Minhas Shai were extremely influential and was used throughout Sephardic and Ashkenazi communities as a base for a text for Torah scrolls. According to Mordechai Breuer the Mesoretic notes can be reconciled to point to a singular text. (Aside from few true arguments between Mesorites) This method can prove which of the surviving Mesoretic manuscripts are the most accurate compared to the others. Through this method, he proved how the Aleppo Codex had virtually no mistakes and fit almost perfectly with the Mesoretic notes.

== Proto-Masoretic Text ==
Some older sources and manuscripts for the biblical text are relatively close to the MT. Some medieval manuscripts also seem close to it. These include New Testament and Talmudic quotations of the text and some of the Dead Sea Scrolls. Overall, manuscripts found in the Judean Desert excluding the Qumran caves are a lot closer to MT than those found in Qumran. In medieval times the Sephardic, Ashkenazi and Italian texts differed slightly from the accurate Tiberian Mesora. There is evidence of texts which can be considered Masoretic from the beginning of the Christian Era.

Many Rabbinic sources seem close to the masoretic version but did have slight differences seen in quotations and explicitly in their philological interpretations known as drashoth.

== Samaritan ==
The Samaritan version of the Pentateuch includes many differences to the Judaic versions with only a minority of them being ideological intentional changes. Some pre-Samaritan texts (which weren't connected to the Samaritans rather close to the sources they used for their version) have survived in fragments in Qumran. It is viewed as an alternative version not necessarily older its pre-masoretic counterpart. The Samaritan texts also have harmonizing edits to resolve discrepancies.

== Septuagint ==
The Septuagint is a Greek translation of the bible written predominantly in Ptolemaic Alexandria. The source it used differed significantly to other Hebrew versions. However some of the differences may be attributed to translators and might not reflect the Hebrew source used.

== In Halacha ==
According to Jewish law a torah scroll is invalid if even one letter is missing. Therefore religious scribes since the Mishnaic era have been extremely careful in preserving the spelling of every letter. However the Talmud acknowledges that the precise tradition of spelling was lost.
