= Interpreter (journal) =

- Discipline: Mormon studies, LDS apologetics
- Language: English
- Edited by: Daniel C. Peterson

Publication details
- History: 2012-present
- Publisher: The Interpreter Foundation (United States)
- Open access: Yes

Standard abbreviations
- ISO 4: Interpreter

Indexing
- ISSN: 2372-1227 (print); 2372-126X (web)

Links
- Journal homepage; Online archive

Interpreter: A Journal of Latter-day Saint Faith and Scholarship (formerly known as "Interpreter: A Journal of Mormon Scripture") is a nonprofit, peer-reviewed, and educational academic journal published by the Interpreter Foundation primarily covering topics related to the canon of scriptures of the Church of Jesus Christ of Latter-day Saints, Mormon studies, and Latter-day Saint apologetics. Reviewers are generally members of the LDS faith, and all contributors are required to not be hostile to the Interpreter Foundation's mission statement and truth claims of Mormonism.

== Background ==
It was established in July 2012 by the Interpreter Foundation with Daniel C. Peterson as founding editor-in-chief. Peterson had previously been the founding editor of the FARMS Review, which in 2011 had been renamed the Mormon Studies Review (MSR) by the heads of the Maxwell Institute (MI). The MSR launched soon after Peterson's release from MI without direct apologetics as one of their goals. Peterson believed that direct apologetics was a necessary feature of a publication like the MSR while others did not. This philosophical difference between Peterson and the editors of the MSR led to the creation of the Interpreter Foundation, which retained apologetic content.

== Activities ==
The Interpreter Foundation sponsors debates and discussions. These have included two symposia focused on the relationship between science and Mormonism. The journal publishes historical surveys, responses to critics, book reviews, personal essays, and other scholarly literature, all with the primary goals of increasing understanding of Latter-day Saint scripture and religion as well as defending it.

== Controversy ==
In 2013, a critical review of Mormon Stories by Gregory L. Smith was published in Interpreter. In the review, Smith alleges that "Dehlin is frequently uninformed of the often controversial material he discusses with interviewees, and that he promotes views hostile to the foundational beliefs of the Church of Jesus Christ of Latter-day Saints". The pending publication of the piece catalyzed within the Mormon studies community a discussion (referred to by some as the Dehlin affair) about the roles of apologetic and non-faith-based scholarship, respectively, within the academic study of Mormonism by Mormons.

== See also ==
- Beliefs and practices of the LDS
- List of Latter Day Saint periodicals
- List of theological journals
- Mormon Stories Podcast: Criticism
