= Brian M. Hauglid =

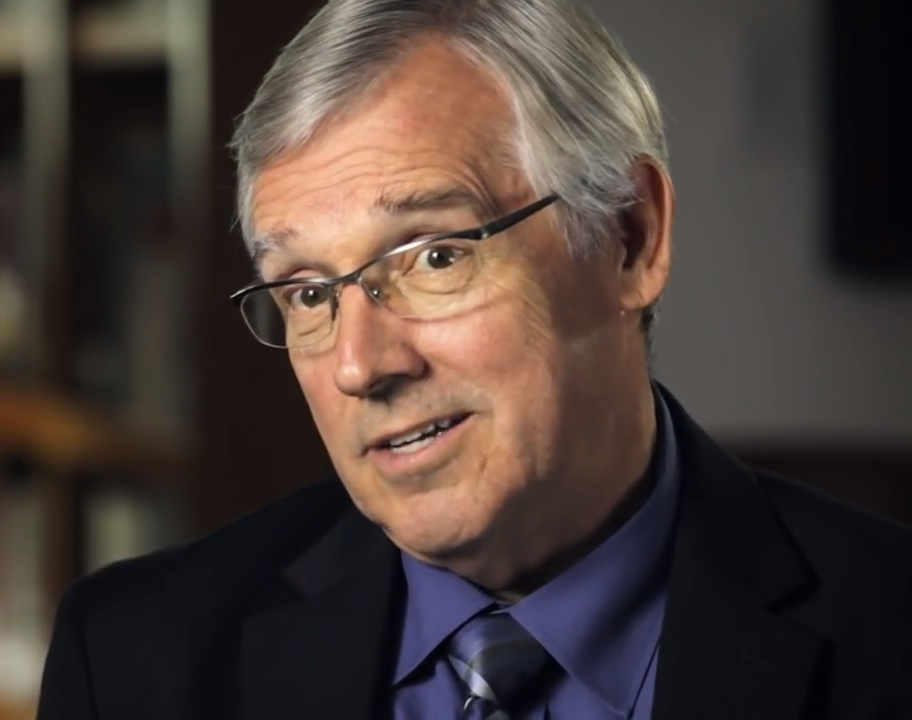
- Brian M. Hauglid in 2016.
- Born: 1954
- Occupation: Historian
- Known for: Mormon studies, Book of Abraham scholarship

Brian M. Hauglid (born 1954) is an emeritus professor of ancient scripture at Brigham Young University (BYU). From 2014 to 2017, he was the editor-in-chief of the Journal of Book of Mormon Studies, and he was the director of the Laura F. Willes Center for Book of Mormon Studies, a part of BYU's Neal A. Maxwell Institute for Religious Scholarship.

== Life and career ==
Hauglid was raised in the suburbs of Minneapolis, Minnesota. He was raised as a Catholic. In 1976, Hauglid was baptized a member of the Church of Jesus Christ of Latter-day Saints (LDS Church). He served a mission for the church in the California Sacramento Mission.

Hauglid has a bachelor's degree in Near Eastern Studies from BYU. He received a PhD from the University of Utah in Arabic and Islamic studies in 1998.

In 1999, he joined the BYU faculty. In addition to his work with the Journal of Book of Mormon Studies and the Willes Center he has been on the editorial advisory board for the Eastern Christian Texts series of BYU's Middle Eastern Texts Initiative. He was also a co-editor of the Maxwell Institute's Studies of the Bible and Antiquity.

Hauglid has been a member of the academic advisory board of the Intermountain West Journal of Religious Studies.

Outside of his professional work, Hauglid has served in multiple positions in the LDS Church, including as a bishop.

=== Scholarship on the Book of Abraham ===
==== Apologetic Work ====
Hauglid has written extensively on the Book of Abraham, a text which Latter-day Saints consider to be scripture. This includes his 2010 A Textual History of the Book of Abraham: Manuscripts and Editions, and with egyptologist John Gee he co-edited the five-volume Studies in the Book of Abraham. Some of Hauglid's work is cited in the Church's Gospel Topics essay on the Translation and Historicity of the Book of Abraham. Both Hauglid and other writers have described his work from this period of his career as apologetic in nature.

==== Distancing from Apologetics ====
In a 2018 Facebook post, Hauglid publicly stated that after a "transformative journey" he had revised some of the views he expressed in A Textual History and "was no longer interested" in apologetics. Hauglid explained he did not believe the Book of Abraham came from a missing section of the Joseph Smith papyri, a theory advanced in his earlier works, and he added that his current views aligned with and were "much more open to" those expressed in a YouTube video by historian Dan Vogel (Vogel had referred and responded to Hauglid's A Textual History in the video).

Hauglid stated that his "recent and forthcoming publications" demonstrated his "changed... mind" and new conclusions about the Book of Abraham. Publications reflecting Hauglid's more recent thoughts on the Book of Abraham include the following: Book of Abraham and Related Manuscripts, The Pearl of Greatest Price: Mormonism's Most Controversial Scripture, and Producing Ancient Scripture: Joseph Smith’s Translation Projects in the Development of Mormon Christianity.

== Publications ==
=== As co-editor ===
- Traditions of the Early Life of Abraham with John Gee and John Tvedtnes
- Astronomy, Papyrus, and Covenant with John Gee
- Revelations and Translations, Volume 4: Book of Abraham and Related Manuscripts. Facsimile edition. Vol. 4 of the Revelations and Translations series of The Joseph Smith Papers with Robin Scott Jensen
- Producing Ancient Scripture: Joseph Smith's Translation Projects in the Development of Mormon Christianity (Salt Lake City: University of Utah Press, 2020) with Michael Hubbard MacKay and Mark Ashurst-McGee

=== As co-author ===
- The Pearl of Greatest Price: Mormonism's Most Controversial Scripture with Terryl L. Givens

=== Book chapters ===
- Hauglid, Brian M. "On the Early Life of Abraham: Biblical and Qur’ānic Intertextuality and the Anticipation of Muḥammad." In John C. Reeves, ed., Bible and Qur’ān: Essays in Scriptural Intertextuality (Boston: Brill, 2004): p. 87-105.
- Hauglid, Brian M. " Approaching Egyptian Papyri through Biblical Language: Joseph Smith’s Use of Hebrew in His Translation of the Book of Abraham." In Michael Hubbard MacKay, Mark Ashurst-McGee, Brian M. Hauglid, ed., Producing Ancient Scripture: Joseph Smith's Translation Projects in the Development of Mormon Christianity (Salt Lake City: University of Utah Press, 2020).
