= Daniel C. Peterson =

American professor of Islamic Studies and Arabic at Brigham Young University

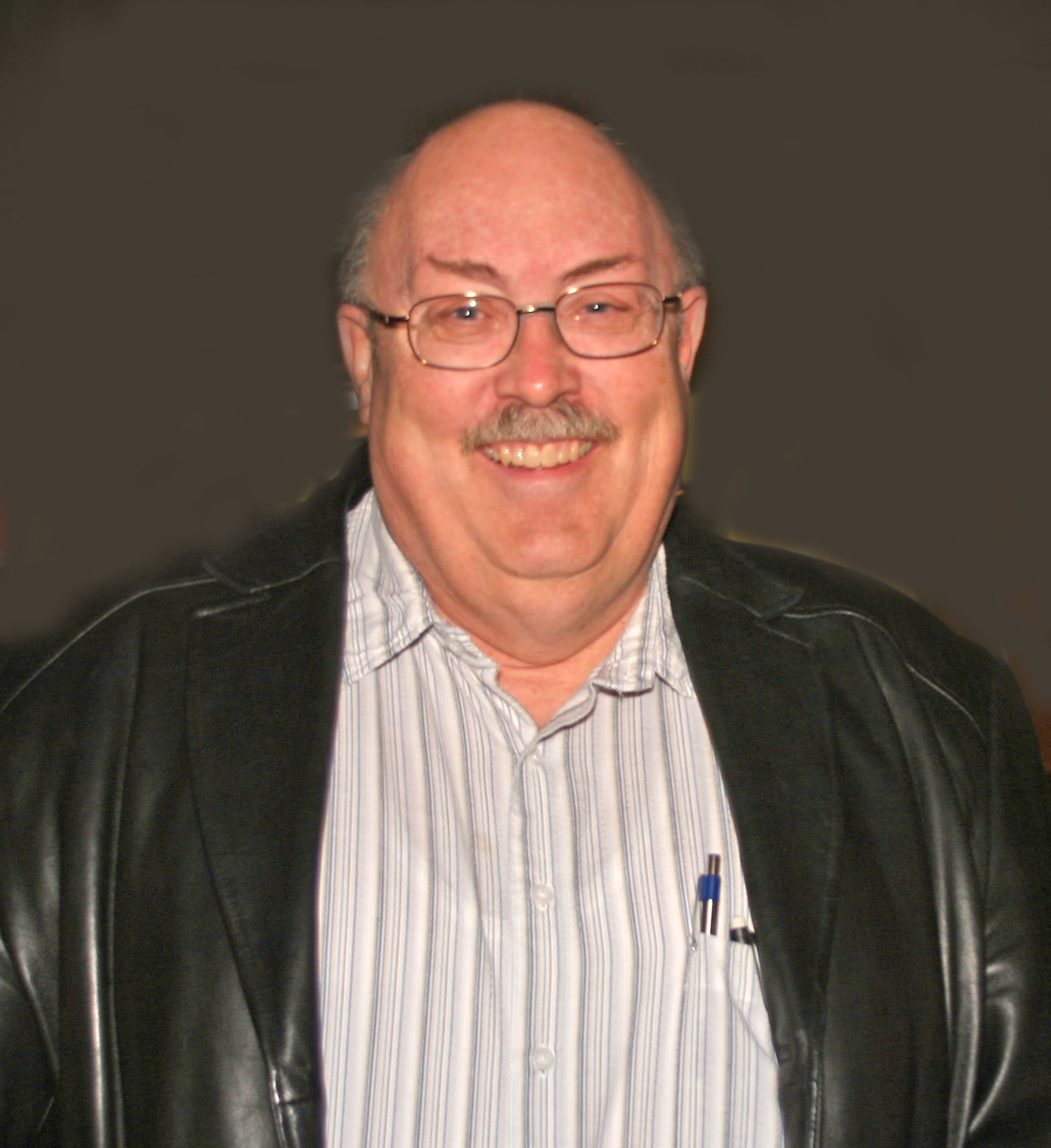
- Born: Daniel Carl Peterson; January 15, 1953 (age 73); California, United States
- Education: University of California, Los Angeles (UCLA); Brigham Young University
- Occupations: Scholar; historian; author; professor
- Employer: Brigham Young University
- Known for: Islamic studies; Mormon apologetics
- Spouse: Deborah Stephens Peterson
- Children: 3

Daniel Carl Peterson (born January 15, 1953) is a retired professor of Islamic Studies and Arabic in the Department of Asian and Near Eastern Languages at Brigham Young University (BYU).

== Career ==
A native of southern California, Peterson received a bachelor's degree in Greek and philosophy from BYU and, after several years of study in Jerusalem and Cairo, earned a Ph.D. in Near Eastern Languages and Cultures from the University of California, Los Angeles (UCLA).

Peterson was a professor of Islamic Studies and Arabic at BYU, where he taught courses in Arabic language and Islamic religion, history and culture. He has authored several books and numerous articles on Islamic and Latter-day Saint topics.

He also founded and served as director of BYU's Middle Eastern Texts Initiative from 1992–2010.

Peterson has served in various capacities including chairman of the board for what is now known as BYU's Neal A. Maxwell Institute for Religious Scholarship. In 2007, in recognition of his establishment of the Middle Eastern Texts Initiative, Peterson was named a Utah Academy Fellow and declared a lifetime member of the Utah Academy of Sciences, Arts, and Letters.

Peterson retired from BYU on July 1, 2021, but is still active in several public non-scholarly projects, including the production of a feature film that tells the story of the three witnesses of the Book of Mormon.

== Apologetics ==
Peterson is known for his work as an apologist and scholar on subjects dealing with claims of the Church of Jesus Christ of Latter-day Saints (LDS Church), of which he is a member. He is the founding editor-in-chief of the FARMS Review (now the Mormon Studies Review), a periodical produced by the Foundation for Ancient Research and Mormon Studies, serving since 1989. The institute replaced Peterson as editor in June 2012.

Peterson is also a regular participant in online fora about Mormonism where he discusses the Latter-day Saint faith and its apologetics. One of his projects has been the development of a website featuring the testimonies of Latter-day Saint scholars. The site is currently entitled Latter-day Saint Scholars Testify and is part of FAIR. As of 2025 it hosts 357 testimonies.

Peterson is the first and current editor-in-chief of Interpreter: A Journal of Latter-day Saint Faith and Scholarship.

== Personal life ==
Peterson served as a missionary in the Switzerland Zurich Mission, with Edwin Q. Cannon serving as his mission president. Peterson later served on the Church's Gospel Doctrine Committee and as a bishop.

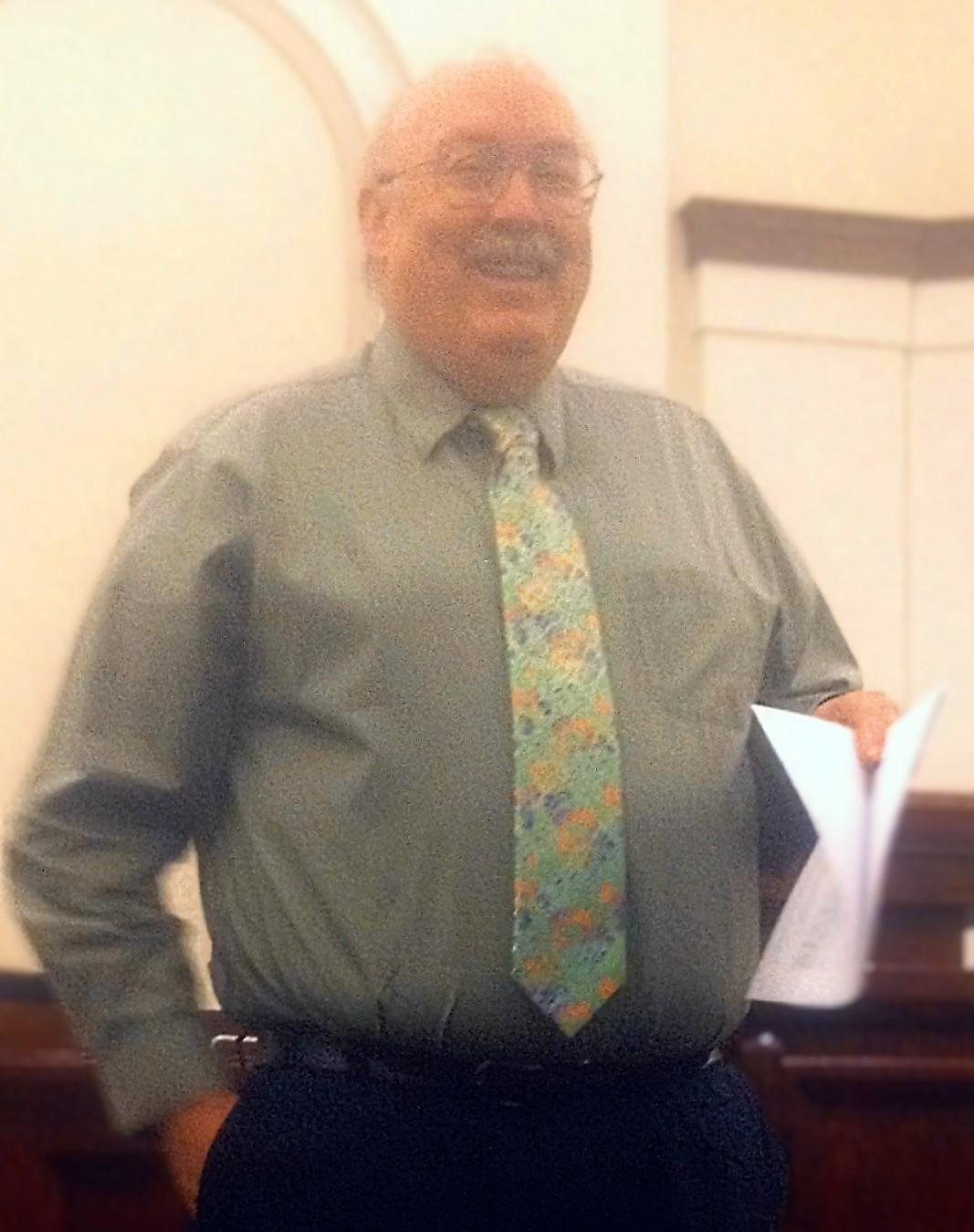
Daniel Peterson teaching seminary.

Peterson and his wife, the former Deborah Stephens, have three sons.

== Publications ==
- Peterson, Daniel C. (1995), Abraham Divided: An LDS Perspective on the Middle East, Aspen Book, ISBN 978-1562362249.
- Peterson, Daniel C. (1998), The Last Days: A Comprehensive Survey of Prophetic and Doctrinal Statements by Latter-Day Prophets and Apostles, Aspen Books, ISBN 978-1562360627.
- ——; Ricks, Stephen D. (1998), Offenders for a Word: How Anti-Mormons Play Word Games to Attack the Latter-Day Saints, Foundation for Ancient Research & Mormon Studies, ISBN 0-934893-35-7, archived from the original on 2015-11-15.
- Parry, Donald W.; Peterson, Daniel C.; Welch, John W., eds. (2002). Echoes and Evidences of the Book of Mormon. Neal A. Maxwell Institute for Religious Scholarship. ISBN 978-0934893725.
- Peterson, Daniel C. (2007), Muhammad, Prophet of God, Grand Rapids, Michigan: Wm. B. Eerdmans Publishing Company, ISBN 978-0-8028-0754-0.
