= Daniel H. Ludlow =

American academic and theologian (1924–2009)

Daniel Hansen Ludlow (March 17, 1924 – February 14, 2009) was a professor of religion at Brigham Young University (BYU) in Provo, Utah. He was also the chief editor of the Encyclopedia of Mormonism, published in 1992 by Macmillan Publishers.

== Biography ==
Ludlow was raised in southern Utah County and attended public schools in such communities as Benjamin, Utah, Goshen, Utah and Spanish Fork. He received a Bachelor of Science in history and English in 1946 from Utah State University, where he served for two years as student body president. He then went on to receive a Master of Arts in education in 1953 from Indiana University Bloomington and a Ph.D. in 1956 from Columbia University.

In 1947, Ludlow published Latter-day Prophets Speak, a compilation of the teachings of various leaders of the Church of Jesus Christ of Latter-day Saints (LDS Church). Ludlow joined the faculty at Brigham Young University in 1955. He served for a time as the dean of Religious Education at BYU. In 1968, Ludlow headed the group of Brigham Young University students who were the first to go to the Holy Land under BYU auspices.

By 1972, Ludlow had left Brigham Young University and had become the director of teacher support services for the Church Educational System of the LDS Church. Ludlow was also one of the leading specialists in assisting Thomas S. Monson, Boyd K. Packer and Bruce R. McConkie in preparing the LDS Church editions of the Standard Works that were released from 1979 to 1981. During part of the 1980s, he served as director of Correlation Review for the LDS Church. Ludlow also served as a Sunday School teacher, as a branch president, as a member of a bishopric, in high councils and stake presidencies, as a regional representative of the Twelve, as president of Australia Perth Mission, and as a temple worker.

Ludlow and his wife Luene had one son, Victor L. Ludlow, and eight daughters. At the time of his death, he had 42 grandchildren and 64 great-grandchildren.

On February 14, 2009, Ludlow died of causes incident to age.

== Publications ==
Ludlow wrote several books of commentary on the scriptures, particularly the Book of Mormon and Doctrine and Covenants. He and his wife jointly wrote some articles for the LDS Church's New Era magazine in the early 1980s.

- Selected Writings of Daniel H. Ludlow. Gospel Scholar Series. 2000.
- How to Get the Most from the Book of Mormon. 1996.
- Encyclopedia of Mormonism. 1992.
