= Stephen D. Ricks =

Stephen David Ricks is a professor of Hebrew at Brigham Young University (BYU) and an author and co-author of several books and articles defending the Church of Jesus Christ of Latter-day Saints (LDS Church) and its teachings.

== Biography ==
Ricks served as a missionary for the LDS Church in Switzerland. He received his Ph.D. from the University of California, Berkeley and Graduate Theological Union.

From 1988 to 1991 Ricks was the president of the Foundation for Ancient Research and Mormon Studies (FARMS) and from 1991 to 1997 he served as the chairman of FARMS board of directors. He was the founding editor of the Journal of Book of Mormon Studies serving as editor from 1992 to 1997.

From 1992 to 1996, Ricks also served as the associate dean of general education and honors at BYU.

Among Ricks's writings is "Joseph Smith and 'Majic': Methodological Reflection on the Use of a Term" (with Daniel C. Peterson) in Robert L. Millet, ed., To Be Learned is Good if... (Salt Lake City: Bookcraft, 1987). Ricks also co-authored Who Shall Ascend into the Hill of the Lord? with Legrand L. Baker. He edited Warfare in the Book of Mormon with William J. Hamblin and translated Klaus Vondung's The Apocalypse in Germany into English.

Ricks has been involved in promoting positive relations between the LDS Church and Jewish groups.
