= Donald W. Parry =

American academic

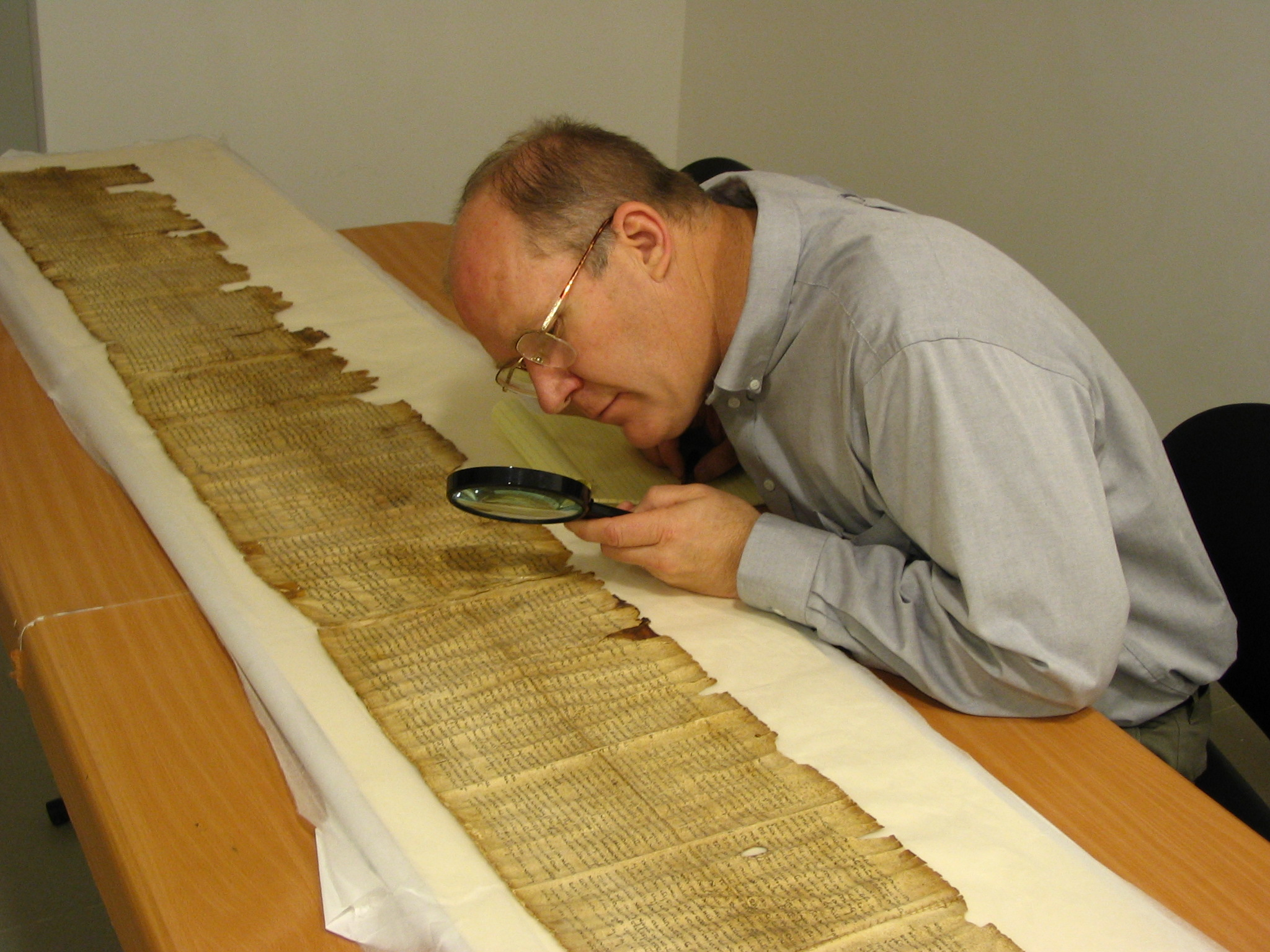
- Parry studies the Great Isaiah Scroll (1QIsa-a) in the Dead Sea Scrolls vault (scrollery), Israeli Museum, Jerusalem, Israel.
- Occupations: Professor, author, editor
- Writing career
- Notable works: Exploring the Isaiah Scrolls and Their Textual Variants; The Dead Sea Scrolls Reader (6 Volumes) Emanuel Tov and Parry; Dead Sea Scrolls Handbook. [Hebrew, with English intro.] Devorah Dimant and Parry

Donald W. Parry is an American academic who is a professor of Hebrew Bible in the Department of Asian and Near Eastern Languages at Brigham Young University. He holds the Abraham O. Smoot Professorship. He is the author and editor of works related to the Dead Sea Scrolls and the Hebrew Bible. He has been a member of the International Team of Translators of the Dead Sea Scrolls since January 1994. He served as a member of the Dead Sea Scrolls Foundation Board of Advisors, 2008–present and presently serves as a member of the Dead Sea Scrolls Foundation Board of Trustees. He is also a member of the International Organization for the Study of the Old Testament, and the National Association of Professors of Hebrew.

He has authored or edited more than forty books, and has written and published more than eighty articles, and has authored or edited more than fifteen volumes on the Dead Sea Scrolls.

He is a member of several other organizations, including the International Organization for the Study of the Old Testament (Groningen, The Netherlands), Society for Biblical Literature (Atlanta, Georgia), and the National Association of Professors of Hebrew (Madison, Wisconsin).

Parry is the Co-founding Director (along with Jennifer A. Mackley, Seattle, Washington) of the Wilford Woodruff Papers Foundation, and currently acts as an advisor of the foundation.
