= Mormon Studies Review =

- Discipline: Mormon studies
- Language: English
- Edited by: Joseph Stuart; Cristina M. Rosetti

Publication details
- Former name(s): Review of Books on the Book of Mormon, FARMS Review of Books, FARMS Review
- History: 1989-present
- Publisher: University of Illinois Press (United States)
- Frequency: Annually

Standard abbreviations
- ISO 4: Mormon Stud. Rev.

Indexing
- ISSN: 2156-8022
- LCCN: 2004212364
- OCLC no.: 755663963

Links
- Journal homepage; Post-renumbering archives (2014–2017); Pre-renumbering archives (1989–2011)

Mormon Studies Review is an annual academic journal covering Mormon studies published by the University of Illinois Press. Previously, until and including its 2018 issue, the journal was published by Brigham Young University's Neal A. Maxwell Institute for Religious Scholarship. In November 2018, ownership transferred to the University of Illinois Press, which continues to publish the journal.

== History ==
The Review of Books on the Book of Mormon was established in 1989 by the Foundation for Ancient Research and Mormon Studies (FARMS), with Daniel C. Peterson as founding editor-in-chief. It was renamed to FARMS Review of Books in 1996, to FARMS Review in 2003, and finally to Mormon Studies Review in 2011, as the FARMS brand had been phased out after being absorbed into the Maxwell Institute in 2006.

Under Peterson's editorship, the journal specialized in Latter-day Saint apologetics. When FARMS joined with BYU in 1997, Peterson said to the Salt Lake Tribune, "FARMS has often had a polemical edge and we are curious to see how or whether that will be accommodated."

== Reboot ==
In 2012, Peterson was removed as editor and the journal entered hiatus as it sought to become more mainstream to Mormon studies. In March 2013, the Maxwell Institute announced the journal would relaunch as a new religious studies review journal, without a primary focus on apologetics. J. Spencer Fluhman, from BYU's department of history, was appointed editor-in-chief with a new broad-based advisory board. The new Review changed from biannual to annual publication, and it restarted its numbering, beginning at volume 1 in 2014, signifying its change in editorial direction as a new publication.

After publishing six volumes, the Maxwell Institute transferred ownership of the Review to the University of Illinois Press. As of 2025, the University of Illinois continues to publish the Review.

== See also ==
- Journal of Book of Mormon Studies
- Interpreter: A Journal of Latter-day Saint Faith and Scholarship
- List of Latter Day Saint periodicals
- List of theology journals
