= Journal of Book of Mormon Studies =

Academic journal

- Discipline: Mormon studies
- Language: English
- Edited by: Joseph M. Spencer

Publication details
- Former name(s): Journal of the Book of Mormon and Other Restoration Scripture
- History: 1992-present
- Publisher: University of Illinois Press on behalf of the Neal A. Maxwell Institute for Religious Scholarship
- Frequency: Annual

Standard abbreviations
- ISO 4: J. Book Mormon Stud.

Indexing
- Journal of Book of Mormon Studies
- ISSN: 2374-4766 (print); 2374-4774 (web)
- LCCN: 2014202708
- OCLC no.: 971959679
- Journal of the Book of Mormon and Other Restoration Scripture (2008–2013)
- ISSN: 1948-7487
- Journal of Book of Mormon Studies (1992–2007)
- ISSN: 2168-3158

Links
- Journal homepage; Online archive

The Journal of Book of Mormon Studies is an annual peer-reviewed academic journal covering topics surrounding the Book of Mormon. It is published by the University of Illinois Press on behalf of the Neal A. Maxwell Institute for Religious Scholarship with funding from the Laura F. Willes Center for Book of Mormon Studies.

== History ==
The journal was established in 1992 as a biannual publication of the Foundation for Ancient Research and Mormon Studies (FARMS) at Brigham Young University (Provo, Utah). BYU is owned and operated by the Church of Jesus Christ of Latter-day Saints (LDS Church), which teaches that the Book of Mormon is sacred scripture alongside the Bible. The journal was a venue for new scholarship from a faithful LDS perspective about Book of Mormon geography (Old World and New World), literary structures, name meanings, ongoing research, and other topics. The journal, along with FARMS, operated from the assumption that the Book of Mormon was historically ancient and was divine scripture. According to American religious historian John-Charles Duffy, the journal took an approach of orthodox scholarship, without an emphasis on polemics or responding to critics of Mormonism. Since its beginning with FARMS, the journal was peer-reviewed, drawing mostly from internal reviewers.

In 1998 the format changed from a plain academic journal style into a glossy magazine, intended to make its work more accessible to general LDS readers in addition to scholars. The journal was promoted to the public in 2003 when LDS Church public affairs referenced its recent articles to answer problems of DNA and the Book of Mormon. The journal's publisher changed in 2006 to the Neal A. Maxwell Institute for Religious Scholarship, which had absorbed FARMS.

The journal was first published in 1992 under its current title. From 2009 to 2013 it was renamed Journal of the Book of Mormon and Restoration Scripture. In 2014, the journal returned to its original name and underwent further changes stemming from new directives from the Maxwell Institute. It went from biennial to annual, adopted an academic printing format, and announced a new mission within the larger field of religious studies for both "Mormon and non-Mormon scholars."

== Abstracting and indexing ==
The journal is abstracted and indexed in the ATLA Religion Database and EBSCO databases.

== Editors-in-chief ==
The following persons are or have been editors-in-chief:

- 1992-1997: Stephen D. Ricks
- 1998-2001: John L. Sorenson
- 2002-2007: S. Kent Brown
- 2008-2009: Andrew H. Hedges
- 2009-2013: Paul Y. Hoskisson
- 2014-2017: Brian M. Hauglid
- 2017-current: Joseph M. Spencer

== See also ==
- Mormon Studies Review
- List of Latter Day Saint periodicals
