= John W. Welch =

John Woodland Welch
- Born: October 15, 1946 (age 79)

Academic background
- Education: University of Oxford; Brigham Young University; Duke University School of Law

Academic work
- Discipline: Law and religion
- Institutions: Brigham Young University

John Woodland "Jack" Welch (born 1946) is a scholar of law and religion. Welch is a member of the Church of Jesus Christ of Latter-day Saints and currently teaches at the J. Reuben Clark Law School (JRCLS) at Brigham Young University (BYU) in Provo, Utah, where he is the Robert K. Thomas University Professor of Law. He is notable for his contributions to LDS (Mormon) scholarship, including his claim to have discovered the ancient literary form chiasmus in the Book of Mormon.

== Biography ==
Welch was founding director of Foundation for Ancient Research and Mormon Studies (FARMS) and, prior to August 2018, was the Editor-in-Chief of the periodical BYU Studies Quarterly. Welch was director of publications for the Joseph Fielding Smith Institute for Latter-day Saint History. While serving as a young missionary in Germany, Welch discovered many instances of the chiasmus literary form in the Book of Mormon. His finding, published in BYU Studies as "Chiasmus in the Book of Mormon" in 1969, and subsequent publications have shaped scholarly inquiry into the linguistic aspects and historical origin of the Book of Mormon.

Welch received bachelor's and master's degrees from BYU (B.A. in History, M.A. in Latin and Greek). He then studied at Oxford University as a Woodrow Wilson Fellow. Welch received a J.D. from Duke University. He is the Robert K. Thomas professor of law in the JRCLS.

In 1979, Welch founded FARMS while working as a lawyer in southern California. He was a member of the board of editors for the Encyclopedia of Mormonism.

Welch was a co-author of Religion and Law: Biblical-Judaic and Islamic Perspectives (ISBN 0931464390)

He is a contributing scholar for the Joseph Smith Papers Project.

== Bibliography ==
- Reexploring the Book of Mormon (1992)
- The Allegory of the Olive Tree (1994)
- Chiasmus in Antiquity (1998)
- Illuminating the Sermon at the Temple and Sermon on the Mount (1998)
- Isaiah in the Book of Mormon (1998)
- King Benjamin's Speech (1998)
- John W. Welch, and J. Gregory Welch, Charting the Book of Mormon (1999)
- Chiasmus Bibliography (1999)
- King Benjamin's Speech Made Simple (1999)
- Pressing Forward with the Book of Mormon (1999)
- Daniel H. Ludlow, S. Kent Brown, and John W. Welch, To All the World (2000)
- Echoes and Evidences of the Book of Mormon (2002)
- Glimpses of Lehi's Jerusalem (2004)
- Apostles and Bishops in Early Christianity (2004)
- Oliver Cowdery: Scribe, Elder, Witness (2006)
- The Legal Cases in the Book of Mormon (2008)
- The Sermon at the Temple and the Sermon on the Mount (2010)
- The Tree of Life (2011)
