= Foundation for Ancient Research and Mormon Studies =

Mormon apologetics organization

Foundation for Ancient Research and Mormon Studies (FARMS)
- Formation: 1979
- Type: Research Institute (Mormon studies)
- Legal status: Retired and retained by Neal A. Maxwell Institute for Religious Scholarship
- Headquarters: Brigham Young University
- Location: Provo, Utah, United States
- Parent organization: Neal A. Maxwell Institute for Religious Scholarship
- Affiliations: The Church of Jesus Christ of Latter-day Saints

The Foundation for Ancient Research and Mormon Studies (FARMS) was an informal collaboration of academics devoted to Latter-day Saint historical scholarship. The organization was established in 1979 as a non-profit organization by John. W. Welch. In 1997, the group became a formal part of Brigham Young University (BYU), which is owned and operated by the Church of Jesus Christ of Latter-day Saints (LDS Church). In 2006, the group became a formal part of the Neal A. Maxwell Institute for Religious Scholarship, formerly known as the Institute for the Study and Preservation of Ancient Religious Texts, BYU. FARMS has since been absorbed into the Maxwell Institute's Laura F. Willes Center for Book of Mormon Studies.

FARMS supported and sponsored what it considered to be "faithful scholarship", which includes academic study and research in support of Christianity and Mormonism, and in particular, the official position of the LDS Church. This research primarily concerned the Book of Mormon, the Book of Abraham, the Old Testament, the New Testament, early Christian history, ancient temples, and other related subjects. While allowing some degree of academic freedom to its scholars, FARMS was committed to the conclusion that LDS scriptures are authentic, historical texts written by prophets of God. FARMS has been criticized by scholars and critics who classify it as an apologetics organization that operated under the auspices of the LDS Church.

== History ==
FARMS was organized by John W. Welch in California in 1979 as a private, not-for-profit educational organization, and Welch brought the foundation with him when he came to teach at BYU in 1980. In 1997, FARMS was invited to become part of BYU by Gordon B. Hinckley, LDS Church president and chairman of the BYU Board of Trustees. Hinckley noted: "FARMS represents the efforts of sincere and dedicated scholars. It has grown to provide strong support and defense of the Church on a professional basis. I wish to express my strong congratulations and appreciation for those who started this effort and who have shepherded it to this point."

In 2001, BYU consolidated FARMS with the Center for the Preservation of Ancient Religious Texts (CPART) and the Middle Eastern Texts Initiative (METI) to form the Institute for the Study and Preservation of Ancient Religious Texts (ISPART). In 2006, ISPART was renamed as the Neal A. Maxwell Institute for Religious Scholarship. Welch was tasked with editing BYU Studies, which was originally slated to join the Maxwell Institute with FARMS. BYU Studies did not ultimately join the Maxwell Institute, however, and Welch's role with FARMS diminished. FARMS continued as a nominal sub-unit of the Maxwell Institute without a distinctive cluster of BYU faculty and staff. It has since been subsumed into the Laura F. Willes Center for Book of Mormon Studies, which "deals principally with the Book of Mormon in ancient and modern settings, as well as with the Doctrine and Covenants, the Pearl of Great Price, and related subjects."

As of 2013, M. Gerald Bradford was the director of the Maxwell Institute, with Brian M. Hauglid as the director of the Willes Center.

In late 2010, Daniel C. Peterson, editor of the FARMS Review for over twenty years, announced the journal would be renamed Mormon Studies Review to reflect "readjustments over the past several years in what is now known as the Neal A. Maxwell Institute for Religious Scholarship; the old title, FARMS, no longer reflects the way we're organized. ... We look forward to continuing under the new name." In mid-2012, the director of the Maxwell Institute removed Peterson from editorship of the Review. Peterson retained his title of editor-in-chief of the Institute's Middle Eastern Texts Initiative until resigning from that post in September 2013. In March 2013, J. Spencer Fluhman was named as the new editor of the Mormon Studies Review, along with a new board featuring a variety of scholars interested in Mormon studies.

== Peer review and scholarly credentials ==
Work produced under FARMS's auspices has been critiqued by Mormons, ex-Mormons, secular scholars, and evangelical Christians.

FARMS has stated that the work it supported "conforms to established canons of scholarship, is peer reviewed, and reflects solely the views of individual authors and editors." John A. Tvedtnes, formerly with FARMS and now retired, claims that "the academic credentials of people who publish with FARMS are questioned only by the critics, never by bona fide scholars," noting that "[t]he list of articles and books published in non-LDS scholarly presses by FARMS authors is impressive indeed. If the critics do not accept FARMS authors as scholars, those authors are at least so acknowledged by the world's scholarly community."

Two evangelical Christian scholars, Carl Mosser and Paul Owen, examined the scholarship produced by FARMS. Their subsequent report at the April 25, 1997, Far West Annual Meeting of the Evangelical Theological Society, praised the high quality of FARMS' scholarship, concluding that their fellow evangelicals had lost the apologetic battle against the Mormons largely due to excellent research and publication by FARMS.

== Apologetics ==
FARMS was an important center for producing work that analyzed the Book of Mormon as an ancient text. It also produced work which critiqued claims by both Mormon enthusiasts, disaffected Mormons, and opponents from evangelical Christianity. Such work has been published in the FARMS Review until 2010, when it was replaced by Mormon Studies Review.

Scholars such as John L. Sorenson say that the publications of FARMS represented a new trend within Mormonism: the emergence of progressive forms of Mormon orthodoxy. While its scholars are committed to literal interpretations of Mormon faith claims, they are willing to rethink traditional understandings of those claims. For example, FARMS has published a limited geography model for the Book of Mormon. This suggests that the events chronicled in the Book of Mormon occurred in a much smaller region than the traditional understanding, which argues the same events occurred across the entire Western Hemisphere. Sorenson writes that supporters of the limited geography idea, including some high-ranking church leaders, believe this model is consistent with anthropological, archaeological and genetic findings about indigenous peoples in the Americas, as well as with the text of the Book of Mormon.

== Controversies ==
FARMS has also been a focus of some controversy both inside and outside the Mormon community, often in response to negative critiques of the works of various scholars. For instance, after his work was reviewed in a FARMS publication, molecular biologist Simon Southerton, a former member of the LDS Church and author of Losing a Lost Tribe: Native Americans, DNA, and the Mormon Church, claimed the organization existed merely to "prop up faith in the Book of Mormon" and that its work "stretched the bounds of credibility to breaking point on almost every critical issue."

=== Polemics ===
Some have accused FARMS of engaging in mean-spirited polemics. One example of this occurred with Signature Books' publication of Grant H. Palmer's book An Insider's View of Mormon Origins. The publication of this book immediately resulted in five negative book reviews by FARMS. Ron Priddis of Signature Books responded to these reviews by stating: "Is nothing beyond the reach of sarcasm by FARMS polemicists?" Priddis refers to the book reviews by FARMS as "tabloid scholarship."

Some authors associated with FARMS have been accused of making ad hominem attacks. FARMS has also been criticized for employing the label "anti-Mormon", and then discounting such works as biased based largely on this pronouncement. In a speech offered before the Sunstone Symposium (titled "Why I No Longer Trust the FARMS Review of Books"), John Hatch said, "After reading the (FARMS) reviews myself, it appears to me, and is my opinion, that FARMS is interested in making Mormonism's past appear as normal as possible to readers by attacking history books that discuss complex or difficult aspects of the church's past. As one who hopes to some day contribute to the body of the New Mormon History, I am deeply troubled by what I see as continued efforts to attack honest scholarly work."

== Publications ==
The following periodicals were published under the FARMS imprint, which was phased out as FARMS was absorbed into BYU's Neal A. Maxwell Institute.

Title	Started	Format	Purpose	Notes
Insights	1981-2012	bimonthly newsletter	research updates, current events, reports on symposia, scripture insights, and publication announcements	Originally titled FARMS Newsletter. Replaced by the Maxwell Institute blog.
FARMS Review	1989-2011	semiannual journal	reviews of publications about Mormonism and the Book of Mormon	As the journal's scope broadened over the years, so did the title: Review of Books on the Book of Mormon (1989–1995), FARMS Review of Books (1996–2002), FARMS Review (2003–2010), and Mormon Studies Review (2011). With editorial changes at the Review during 2012-13, this final name was continued for a new Mormon Studies Review that restarted at volume 1 in 2014.
Journal of Book of Mormon Studies	1992–	annual journal	the latest research on the Book of Mormon	Was titled Journal of the Book of Mormon and Other Restoration Scripture from 2009 to 2013. Returned to original title and changed from semiannual to annual in 2014.

FARMS has republished much work by the LDS scholar Hugh Nibley in the 19-volume Collected Works of Hugh Nibley. It has also published other books, as well as audio and video recordings.

== See also ==
- Reformed Egyptian
