= Breathing Permit of Hôr =

Ancient Egyptian funerary text used in Mormon scripture

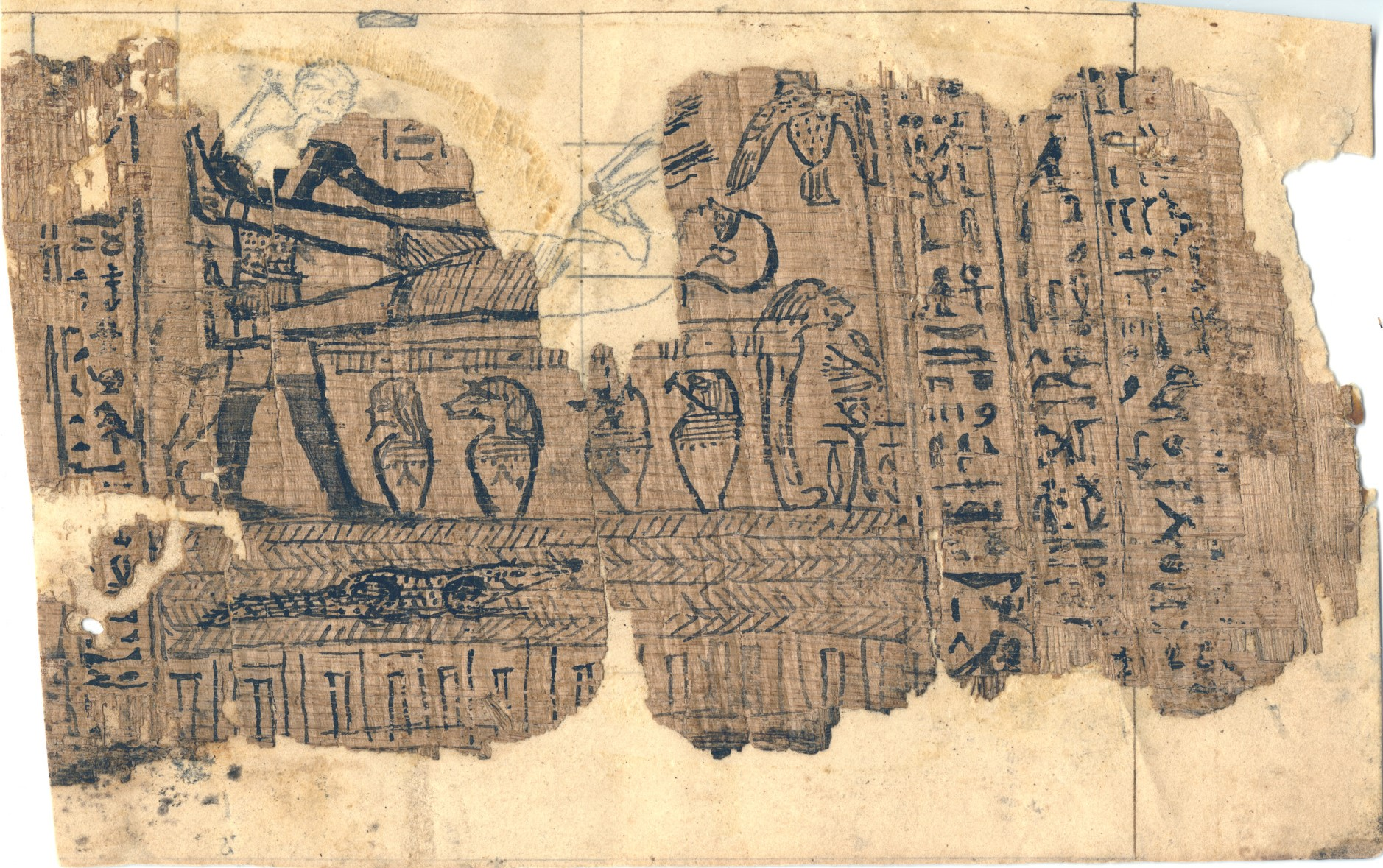
Section of the breathing permit used to make Facsimile 1

The Breathing Permit of Hôr or Hor Book of Breathing is a Ptolemaic-era (305–30 BCE) funerary text written for a Theban priest named Hôr. The breathing permit or Book of Breathing assisted its owner in navigating through the afterlife, being judged worthy and living forever.

Hôr (sometimes rendered as Horus or Horos) came from an important family of Theban Priests of Amon-Re in the cult of "Min who massacres his enemies". His family tree can be reliably reconstructed from independent sources to eight generations.

Hôr's mummy and breathing permit were disinterred by Antonio Lebolo in the early 1800s and eventually sold to Joseph Smith, founder of the Latter Day Saint movement, as part of a larger collection of at least four other funerary documents and three other mummies that came to be known as the Joseph Smith Papyri. The scroll of Hôr is a source that Smith used in what he said was a translation of the Book of Abraham and as such has been highly studied and the source of great controversy.

== Background ==
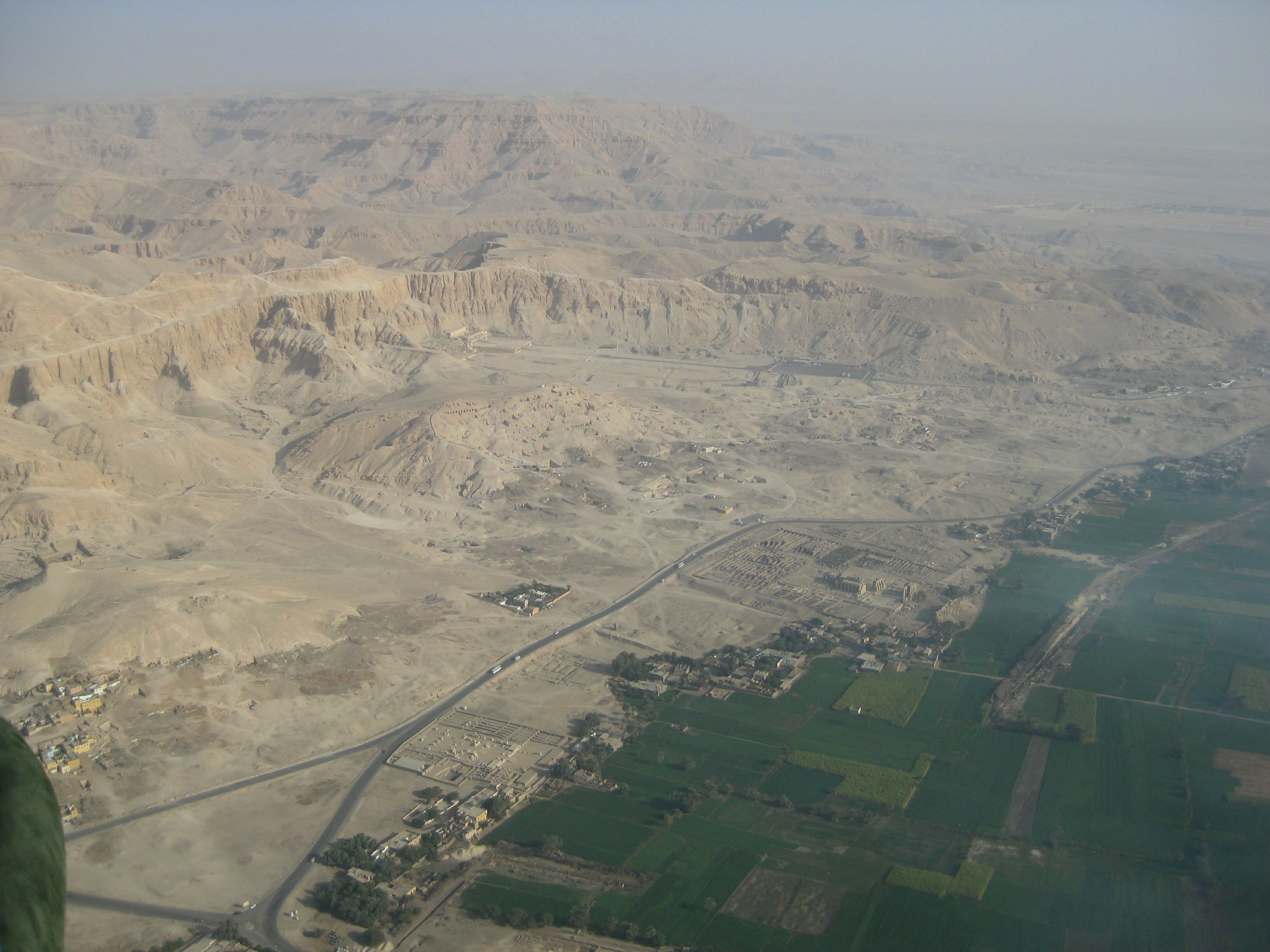
Aerial view of Theban Necropolis, east of Luxor, where it is believed Lebolo excavated the Joseph Smith Papyri

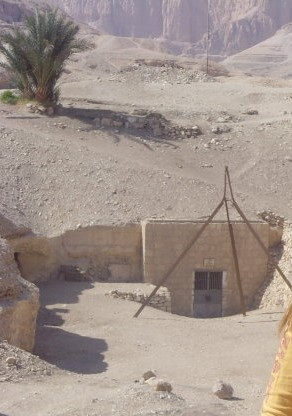
One of the Theban Tombs where Lebolo was believed to have excavated

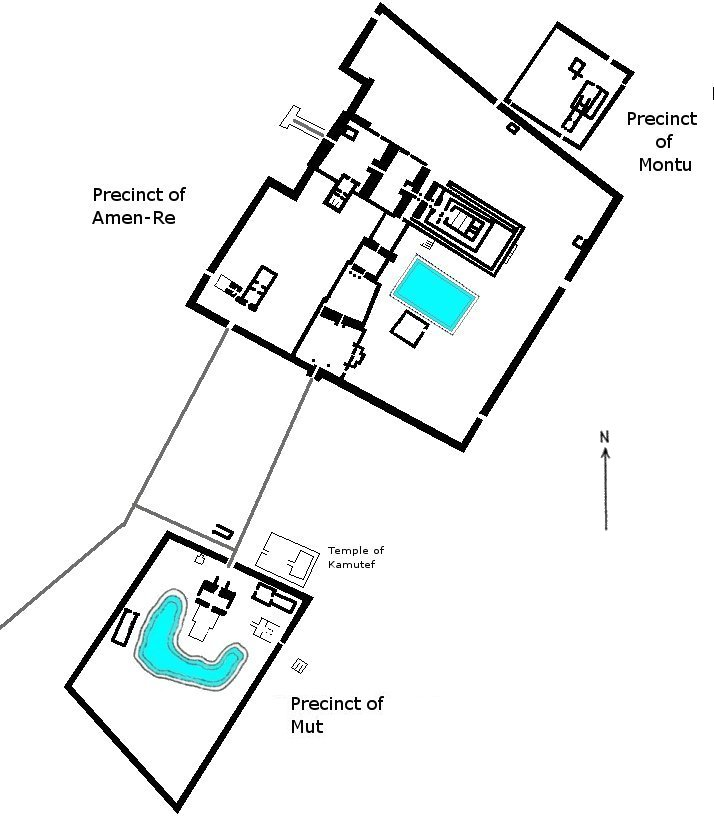
Temple complex in Thebes where Horos would have officiated (see main article Karnak)

Sometime in the years after the sale to Joseph Smith in 1835, the first part of the scroll was cut up and placed in picture frames. After the death of Joseph Smith, the papyri collection was eventually split up and parts were destroyed in the Great Chicago Fire of 1871. The entire collection was presumed lost, but some segments of the scroll were rediscovered at the New York Metropolitan Museum in 1966. Since that time the remaining papyri, including the first few sections of the Breathing Permit of Hôr, have been owned by the Church of Jesus Christ of Latter-day Saints (LDS Church).

== Relationship with the Book of Abraham ==
This scroll is widely believed by scholars in and outside the LDS Church to be the scroll to which the Book of Abraham was ascribed by Joseph Smith. This is based on the inclusion of Facsimile #1 (JSP I) and #3 from this scroll in the Book of Abraham, and titled by Joseph Smith as "from the Book of Abraham". Further evidence is that characters from this scroll were sequentially copied into the Book of Abraham translation manuscripts.

There is also widespread agreement that the text of the Book of Abraham does not come from the remaining papyri fragments. Some apologists in the LDS Church, notably Hugh Nibley and John Gee, argue that the source of the Book of Abraham was appended to the end of this scroll, after the Breathing Permit.

== Reconstruction ==
The papyri fragments from the Joseph Smith Papyri collection known as JSP I, X, XI, and the now missing Facsimile #3 from Smith's published Book of Abraham can be reassembled to partially reconstruct the scroll containing the Breathing Permit belonging to the priest Hôr (also known as Horus). Portions of the papyri from JSP X and XI were damaged, and re-pasted incorrectly into lacunae in JSP IV, but do not belong to JSP IV.

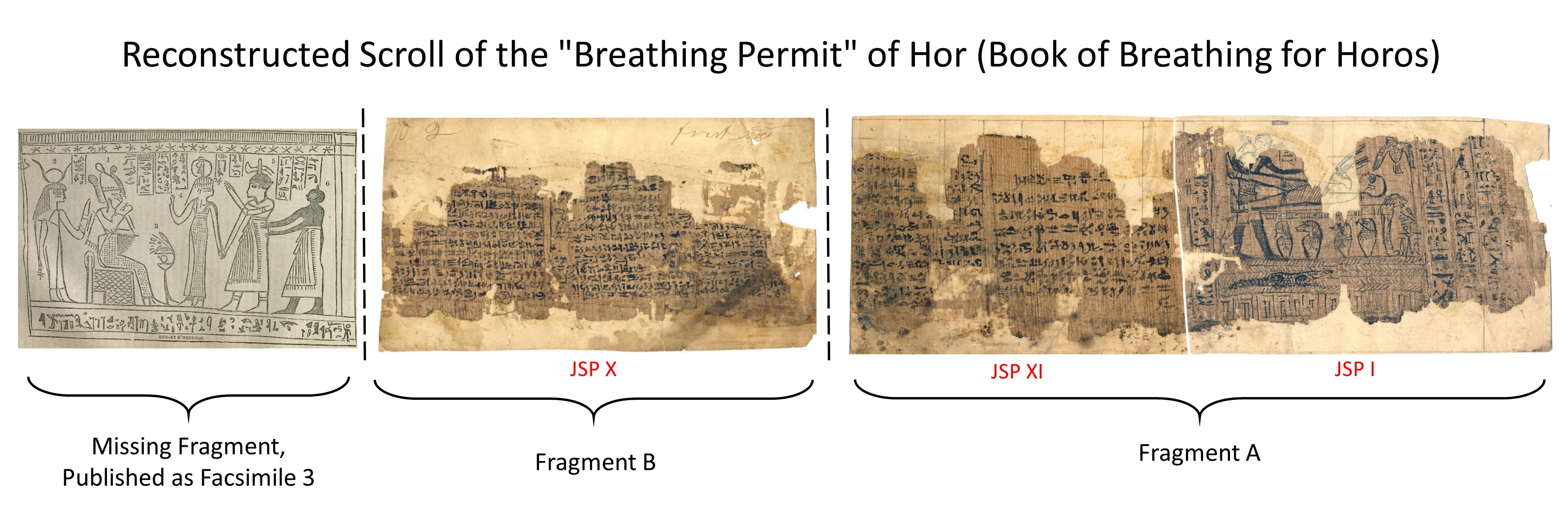
Reconstruction of the remaining fragments of the "Breathing Permit" of Hor (Book of Breathing for Horos) read from right to left. Facsimile 3 is believed to be the end of the "Breathing Permit", and hence the end of the scroll. There are about two columns of missing text from the Breathing Permit after Fragment B.

== Dating ==
The handwriting was identified as being "of the late Ptolemaic or early Roman Period, about the time of Christ". Jan Quaegebeur has suggested a date in the first half of the second century B.C. Hôr's genealogy can be reliably traced from a variety of ancient sources, including another funerary document belonging to Hôr found in 1998, showing with certainty that Hôr was a member of a prominent priestly family from the Ptolemaic era.

Chaponchonsis	Tapois
Osoroeris	Chibois
Hôr
Osoroeris	Osoroeris	Senmonthis
Herius
Hôr	Spotous
Hôr	Senchonsis
Harsiesis	Estneteretten
Techensephonuchos
Mentemes	Touaksis	Hôr
Harsiesis

== Comparison of Joseph Smith Papyrus I with other similar vignettes ==
As of 1998, there were 29 known examples of the Book of Breathings, of which the Joseph Smith papyri fragment is an example. Of those twenty-nine, eighteen have vignettes associated with them. Although no two facsimiles are completely identical, there are common features among all. A comparison of the Book of Abraham facsimiles with these other documents indicates that although the Book of Abraham Facsimile No. 1 (derived from JSP I) is unique, these differences are superficial, and not significant enough to indicate that they are anything other than a representation of an Egyption re-animation scene from the Book of Breathing Made by Isis.

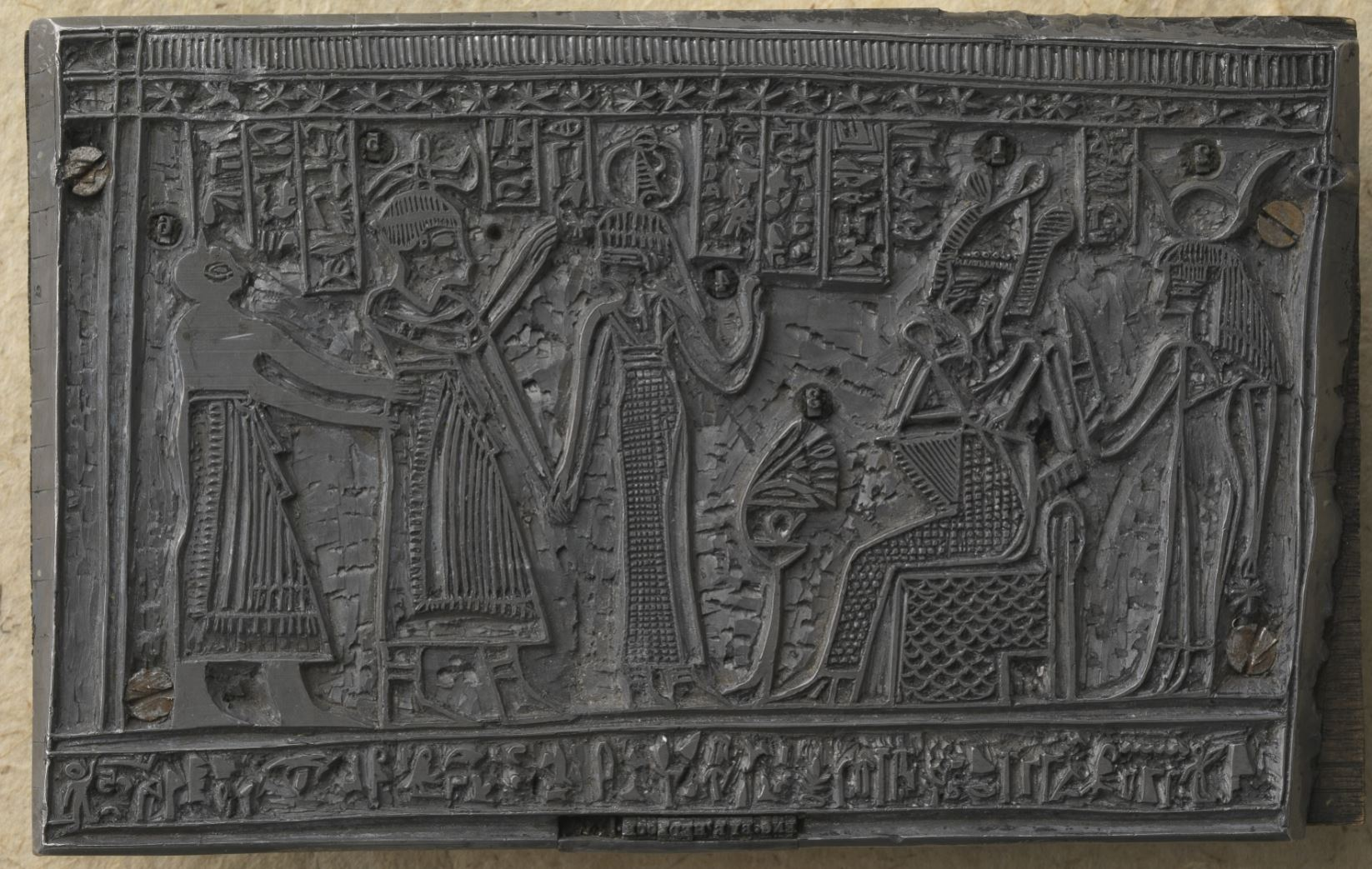
Printing Plate for Facsimile #3, the closing vignette of the Breathing Permit. The original papyri this was based on no longer exists.

== Controversy surrounding the length of the scroll ==
The official position taken by the LDS Church on the papyri is that "Mormon and non-Mormon Egyptologists agree that the characters on the fragments do not match the translation given in the book of Abraham". Given this, some Mormon apologists have postulated that the Book of Abraham manuscript was appended to the end of this scroll, and is no longer extant. The evidence for this claim is 1840s and 1850s accounts from visitors to Nauvoo who viewed the papyri after they had been separated and framed.

The current Book of Abraham in English has about 5,506 words, which would correlate to a length of 5.11 meters of papyri. John Taylor wrote in a church newspaper that Joseph Smith stated he would produce more "extracts from the Book of Abraham".

By taking the length of current fragments, plus estimating how much space would have been taken by the missing section of the Book of Breathing, the size of the scroll has been estimated to be between 150 and 156 cm.

If a scroll is damaged while rolled up, and the damage seeps to more than one layer, the length of the scroll can also be estimated by measuring the distance between the damaged sections. By noting the decreasing distance between damaged sections, the length of the scroll can be extrapolated. Using this method, the Horus scroll is corroborated to be around 150 cm.

While funerary texts were sometimes included at the end of funerary compositions, it would be a unique discovery to find a non-funerary text such as the Book of Abraham appended. Egyptologist Marc Coenen stated, "Concluding that a record of Abraham or any other text foreign to Ptolemaic Egyptian funerary and/or liturgical practice was once attached to the Smith papyri is an assertion not based upon widely accepted Egyptological analysis."

After examining the evidence, Egyptologist Robert Ritner said, "There can be no question of any 'lost' section of the papyrus that contained an ancient text composed by Abraham, since [Joseph Smith] claims and depicts the Ptolemaic vignette as his own addition (Facsimile 1)".

== Translation ==
The papyri have been translated several times. For the first translation, the editors of an independent quarterly journal, Dialogue, arranged for John A. Wilson and Klaus Baer of the Oriental Institute at the University of Chicago and Richard Anthony Parker, Director of the Department of Egyptology at Brown University to translate the text from the photographs. Their translations were published in Dialogue in the summer and autumn of 1968. Klaus Baer was an instructor of Hugh Nibley, and the two maintained good relations throughout their careers. For Baer's translation, Nibley arranged for Baer to see the papyri. Baer wrote: "Just before this paper went to press, Professor Nibley was kind enough to show me the original papyri at Brigham Young University."

Nibley himself performed a transliteration in 1975 (revised in 2005 by John Gee and Michael Rhodes). This transliteration was purposefully made without regard to grammar, as such it does not flow well in English, as Nibley himself was aware. Other notable translations are a 2002 translation by Mormon Egyptologist Michael Rhodes and a 2011 translation by non-Mormon Egyptologist Robert Ritner of the University of Chicago (also John Gee's instructor).

The papyri were written in hieratic Egyptian characters (a sort of cursive hieroglyphic), and is read from right to left. (Lacunae in the manuscript are shown with an ellipsis or "[?]"). The translations below were presented side by side, with line breaks for ease of comparison, but were not part of their translation. The Pilcrow symbol (¶) denotes a paragraph that translator added to their translation, but is not part of the Egyptian text.

In Baer's translation, missing text that was inferred from other similar book of breathings were noted in italic. Nibley did not translate missing text, only translating words that were on the papyri. Rhodes and Ritner denoted missing text with brackets []. Text in-between brackets were inferred from other similar book of breathings.

=== Fragment A ===
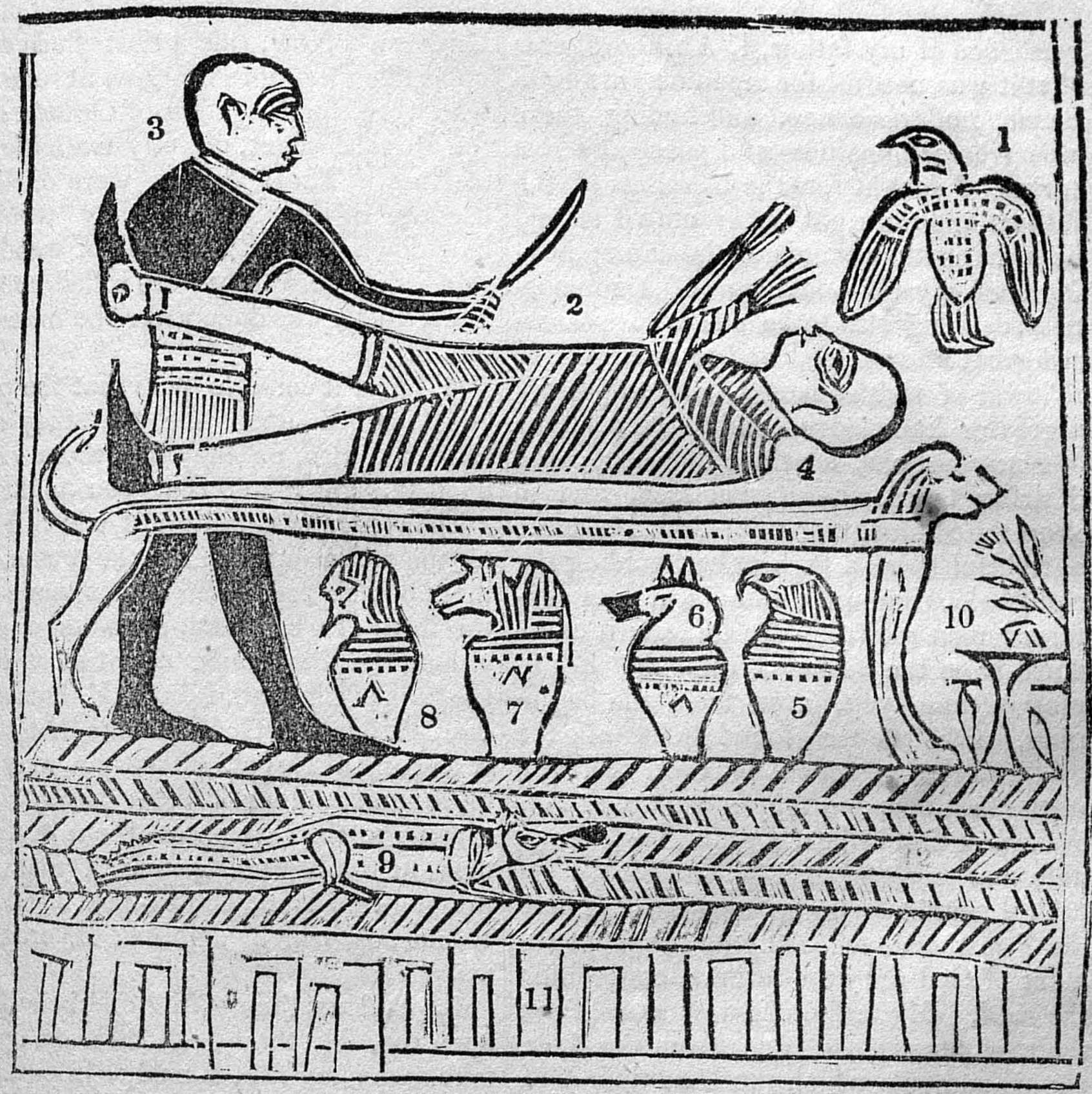
Facsimile No. 1 from the Book of Abraham

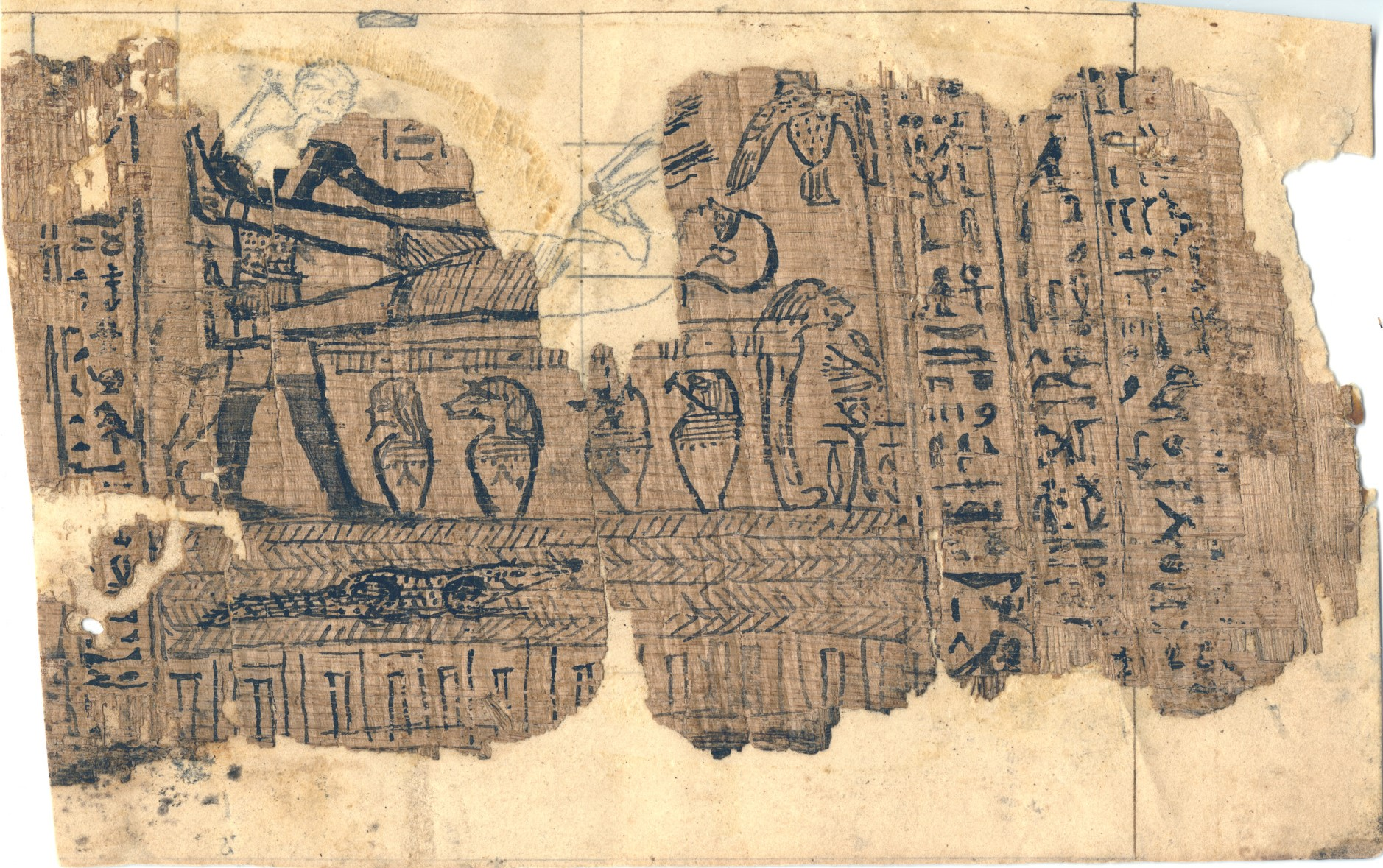
Opening Vignette of the Breathing Permit of Hôr

JSP Fragment I, text surrounding the vignette known as facsimile #1. This is an introductory section of the Book of Breathing. Hugh Nibley did not make a translation of this opening vignette.

Preamble to the Breathing Document: Address to Hôr from Fragment I
Ritner (2010)	Rhodes (2002)	Baer (1968)
(I/1)[Osiris, the god's father], prophet of Amon-Re, King of the Gods, prophet of Min who slaughters his enemies, prophet of Khonsu, the [one who exercises] authority in Thebes, (I/2) [...] ... Hôr, the justified, son of the similarly titled overseer of secrets and purifier of the god, Osorwer, the justified, born by the [housewife and sistrum-player of] (I/3) [Amon]-Re, Taikhibit, the justified!¶ May your ba-spirit live among them, and may you be buried on the west [of Thebes].¶ (I/4) [O Anubis(?) ...] justification?. (I/5) [May you give to him] a good and splendid burial on the west of Thebes as on the mountains of Ma[nu].¶	(1)[The Osiris, God's father] priest of Amon-Re, king of the gods, priest of Min, who massacres his enemies, priest of Khonsu, who is powerful in Thebes. (2)...Hor, justified, the son of one of like titles, master of the secrets, god's priest, Usirwer, justified, born of [the house wife, the musician (3) of Amon-Re,] Taykhebyt. May your soul live in their midst. May you be buried at the head of the West. ... (4) ... (5)[...] May you give to him beautiful and useful things on the west [of Thebes] like the mountains of Manu.¶	(lines 1–3) ... the prophet of Amonrasontêr, prophet [?] of Khons the Governor, ... Hôr, justified, son of the holder of the same titles, master of secrets, and purifier of the gods Osorwêr, justified [?] ... Tikhebyt, justified. May your ba live among them, and may you be buried in the West ... (line 5) May you give him a good, splendid burial on the West of Thebes just like ...¶

==== JSP Fragment I, Vignette ====
According to Baer, Coenen and Quaegebeur, the scene represents the resurrection of Hor (as Osiris) aided by Anubis. Osiris lies on a lion couch, with Anubis, the jackal headed god standing over him. Four canopic jars are shown below the figures, which have lids representing the four sons of Horus, Imset, Hapi, Qebeh-senuwef, and Duwa-mutef. According to Baer, Osiris was "almost certainly represented as ithyphallic" (with an erection), "ready to beget Horus", grasping his anthropomorphic penis. Michael D. Rhodes says this interpretation is unlikely because in all other conception scenes the reclining figure is nude and in this one he appears to be wearing a kilt.

==== JSP XI (two columns) ====
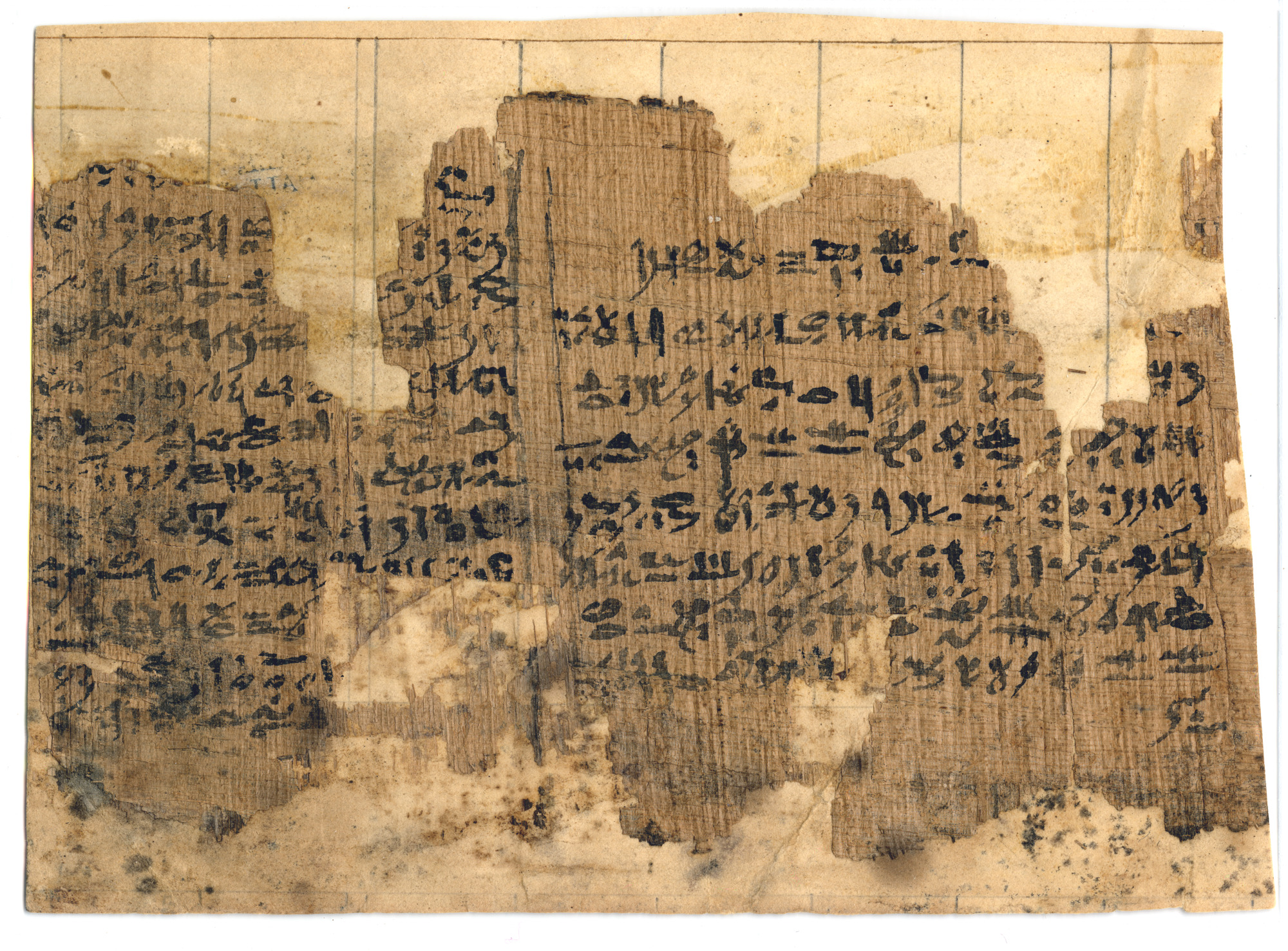
JSP XI, the second fragment in the Breathing Permit

Section 2: Directions for Use of the Breathing Document from Fragment XI
Ritner (2010)	Rhodes (2002)	Nibley (1975)	Baer (1968)
[(II/1) Osiris shall be towed in]to the great lake of Khonsu, (II/2) and likewise [the Osiris Hôr, the justified,] born of Taikhibit, the justified, (II/3) after his two arms have been [placed] at his heart, while (II/4) the Breathing Document, being what (II/5) is written on its interior and exterior, shall be wrapped in royal linen and placed (under) his left arm at the midpoint of his heart. The remainder of his (II/7) wrapping shall be made over it.¶ As for the one for whom this book is made, (II/8) he thus breathes like the ba-spirit[s] of the gods, forever and (II/9) ever.¶	1. [Osiris shall be brought in] to the great pool of Khonsu, (2) and likewise [the Osiris Hor, justified] born of Taykhebyt, justified, (3) after his two hands have been clasped to his heart. (4) The Document of Breathing which <Isis> made shall (also) be buried, which (5) is written on both the inside and outside of it, (wrapped) in royal linen, being placed <under> his (6) left arm near his heart, while the bearer of (7) his coffin works on its outside.¶ If this book is made for him, then he will (8) breathe like the souls of the gods forever and (9) ever.¶	(I/1) inside (of) the lake great (of) Chonsu (2) born of Taykhebyt justified likewise (3) after clasp-ed (two)arms his upon breast his being as wrap- (4)-ped like a book (or roll); the Book of Breathings being written according-to-what is (5) in (the sacred) writings (books) on both inside and outside in linen (of) the king One places (or, is placed) arm (6) left his vicinity of heart his, having-been-done this for his (7) wrapping on (the) side outer If makes one for him book this, then (8) breathes he like souls (of the) gods for time and eternity¶	Col i Osiris shall be conveyed into the Great Pool of Khons—and likewise Osiris Hôr, justified, born to Tikhebyt, justified—after his arms have been placed on his heart and the Breathing Permit (which [Isis] made and has writing on its inside and outside) has been wrapped in royal linen and placed under his left arm near his heart; the rest of his mummy-bandages should be wrapped over it. The man for whom this book has been copied will breathe forever and ever as the bas of the gods do.¶

Section 3: The Main Body of the Breathing Document from Fragment XI
par.	Ritner (2010)	Rhodes (2002)	Nibley (1975)	Baer (1968)
1	(III/1) Beginning of the [Breath]ing [Document] that [Isis] made [for her brother Osiris in order to revivify his ba-spirit, to revivify his corpse, and to rejuvenate all his limbs] (III/2) again, [so that he might unire with] the horizon together with his father Re, [so that his ba-spirit might be made to appear gloriously in heaven in the moon disk, so that his corpse might shine in Orion within the body of (the sky-goddess) Nut, so that] (III/3) the same things might be made to happen to the Osiris Hôr, the justified, son [of ... Osorwer, the justified, born of Taikhibit, the justified.] Hide (it)! Conceal (it)! (III/4) Do not let anyone read it! [It] is effective [for a man in the necropolis, so that he might live again,][being proved]truly[effective], millions of times.¶	2. The beginning [of the Document of Breathing], which [Isis] made [for her brother, Osiris to cause his soul to live, to cause his soul to live, to cause his body to live, to rejuvenate all his limbs], (2) again, [so that he might join] the horizon with his father, Re, [to cause his soul to appear in heaven as the disk of the moon, so that his body might shine like Orion in the womb of Nut, and to] (3) cause [the same] thing to happen to the Osiris Hor, justified, [born of Taykhebyt, justified.]¶ Hide (it)! Keep (it) secret! (4) Do not let anyone read it, since [it is] effective [for a man in the god's domain so that he might live again] successfully millions of times.¶	(II/1) "Beginning of Breathings made (by ...) (2) a second time [...] horizon with father his Ra (3) to cause to happen [the likes of] this to Osiris Horus justified (4) do-not thou let read it man any beneficial (proven) millions of times¶	"Here begins the Breathing Permit, which Isis made for her brother Osiris in order to revive his ba, to revive his corpse, and to make his entire body young again, so that he might appear gloriously in heaven in the disk of the moon, and that his corpse might shine in Orion in the belly of Nut -- and in order that the same might happen to Osiris Hôr...Keep it secret! Do not let anyone read it. It is useful for a man in the Necropolis, to help him live again and it has worked successfully millions of times."¶
2	(III/5) "Hail, [Osiris Ho]r, the justified, born of Tai[khibit, the justified! You are pure! Your heart is pure! Your front is in] a state of purity, your rear (III/6) is in a state of cleanliness, and your interior parts consist of soda and [natron. There is no limb of yours in an evil state.] The Os[iris Ho]r the justified, born of (III/7) Taikhibit, the justified, [has been purified] in this pool of [the Fields of Offerings on the north of the Fields of Locusts.] Edjo and Nekhbet have purified you (III/8 in the fourth hour of night and in the fourth hour [of day. Come, then, Osiris Hôr, the justified, born of Taikhibi]t, the justified! May you enter into the Hall of the (III/9) Two Truths, since you are pure from [all] impurity [and every abomination. 'Rock of Truth' is your name.]¶	(5) O [Osiris] Hor, justified, born of Ta[ykhebyt, justified, you have been purified. Your heart has been purified. Your front is in] (a state of) purity, and your back (6) is in (a state of) cleanliness. Your midsection is (cleansed) with soda [and natron. There is no part of you (polluted) by sin.¶ May the Osiris Hor,] justified, born of (7) Taykhebyt, justified, be purified in that pool of [the Field of Offerings to the north of the Field of the Grasshopper.] May Wadjet (8) and Nekhbet purify you in the fourth hour of the night and the [fourth] hour [of the day.¶ Come, Osiris Hor, justified, born of Taykhebyt], justified, May you enter the Hall (9) of the Two Truths, having been purified from every sin [and misdeed. Stone of Truth is your name.]¶	(II/5) Hail (Osiris) Hor justified born to Tay(khebyt) purified back-parts thine (6) by (a) cleansing inner-parts thine with natron [...] justified, born of (7) Rmn-y-qai justified in pool this of [...] makes-clean thee Edjo (8) Nekhbet in hour fourth of night hour [...] Khebyt justified enter(est)-thou into the (broad) hall (9)(of the) Two Maats thou-being purified from sins¶	O Osiris Hôr ..., you are pure. Your heart is pure. Your front is in a state of purity, your back is in a state of cleanliness, and your middle is cleansed with natron. No part of you is engaged in wrong-doing. Osiris Hôr ... has purified himself in that Pool of the Field of Offerings to the north of the Field of Locusts. Uto and Nekhbet have purified you in the third hour of the night and the third hour of the day. Come, Osiris Hôr ..., that you may enter the Hall of Double Justice. You have been purified of all impurity and all sin. True Precious Stone is your name.¶
3	[Hail,] Osiris Hôr, the justified! May you enter (III/10) into the Underworld [in] a state of great purity. [The Two Truths] have purified you in the [Great Hall. Purification is made for you in the Hall of Geb. Your limb]s [have been purified] in the Hall of (III/11) Shu. You see Re at his setting, A[tum at twilight. Amon is with you, giving you breath. Ptah fashion]s (III/12) your limbs. May you enter into the horizon with Re. [May your ba-spirit be received into the Neshmet-bark with Osiris.] (IV/1) [May] your ba-spirit [be deified in the Estate of Geb, since you are justified forever and ever.]¶	[O] Osiris Hor, justified, may you enter (10) into the hereafter [in] a state of great purity. [May the two Goddesses of Truth] purify you [in the Great Hall. May a purification be performed for you in the Hall of Geb], and may your body [be purified] in the Hall (11) of Shu. You see Re when [he] sets and [Atum in the evening. Amon is with you, giving you breath and Ptah (12) is fashioning] your limbs.¶ May you enter into the horizon together with Re. [May they receive your soul into the Neshmet boat with Osiris. May they make your soul divine in the House of Geb, (13) since you are justified forever and ever.]¶	(II/9) Osiris Hor justified enter(est) thou (10) into Duat (with) purification great Purify thee [...] in great hall (11) (of) Shu thou art about to see Re in his setting (12) (fashion)ing body thine [...] enter(est) thou into horizon with Re'¶	O Osiris Hôr ..., you have entered the Netherworld in a state of purity. The Double Goddess of Justice has purified you greatly in the Great Hall. A purification has been made for you in the Hall of Geb. Your body has been purified in the Hall of Shu. You see Re when he sets and Atum at twilight. Amon is with you and gives you breath. Ptah shapes your body, that you may enter the horizon with Re. Your ba has been welcomed into the Neshmet-bark together with Osiris; your ba has been made divine in the palace of Geb. You are justified forever and ever.¶

=== Fragment B ===
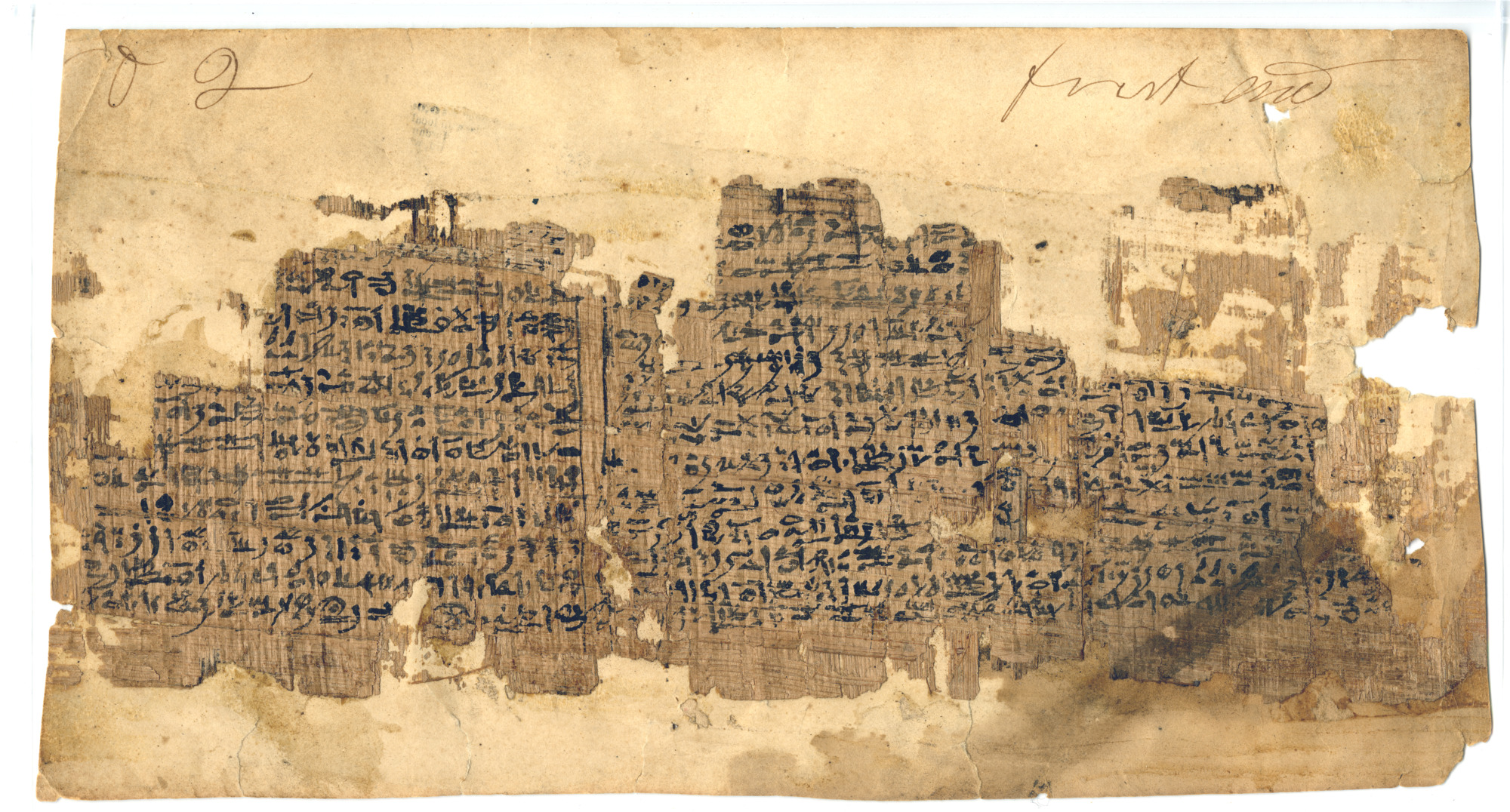
JSP Papyri Fragment X, the third papyri fragment of the Breathing Permit

Section 3: The Main Body of the Breathing Document continued from Fragment X
par.	Ritner (2010)	Rhodes (2002)	Nibley (1975)	Baer (1968)
4	[Osiris] Hôr, the justified, born of Tai[khibit, the justified! May your name end]ure, may your corpse abide, and may your mummy thrive. [You shall not be turned away] (IV/2) [in heaven or on earth. May your face be illuminated in the presence of Re.] May your ba-spirit live in the presence of Amon. May your [cor]pse be rejuvenated in the presence of Osiris. May you breathe forever [and ev]er.¶	3. [Osiris] Hor, justified, born of Tay[khebyt, justified, may] your name [endure] and may your body last, then [your mummy] will flourish. [You shall never be turned back; (2) from heaven or earth. May you be made happy in the presence of Re.] May your soul live in the presence of Amon. May your [body] be renewed in the presence of Osiris. May you breathe forever [and ever.]¶	(III/1) Hor justified born of Tay(khbyt) (en)dures name thine is steadfast corpse thine flourishes every day (2) lives Ba thine before (in the presence of) Amon (is) young corpse thine before (in the presence of) Osiris breathest thou unto eternity¶	Osiris Hôr ..., your name endures, your corpse lasts, and your mummy is permanent. You have not been repulsed in heaven or on earth. Your face has been gladdened in the presence of Re, your ba lives in the presence of Amon, and your corpse has been rejuvenated in the presence of Osiris, that you may breathe forever and ever.¶
5	(IV/3) [May your ba-spirit make for you an invocation-offering consisting of bread, beer, beef and fowl, and of cool water and incen]se in the course of [every] day. [Your flesh is on] your bones in accordance with the form that you had on earth. May you drink with your throat. (IV/4) [May you eat with your mouth. May you receive] offering bread together with [the ba-spirits of the gods.] Anubis has [gua]rded you. He has made your protection. You shall not be turned [away] from the doors (IV/5) [of the Underworld. Thoth], the Thrice [Great]est, Lord of Hermopolis, [has come to you.] He has writ[ten] for you a Breathing Document with his own fingers, so that (IV/6) [your ba-spirit] may breathe [forever, and that you might regain the fo]rm that you had on earth among the living, since you are divine together with the ba-spirits of the gods. Your heart is the heart of Re; your flesh (IV/7) [is the flesh of the great god.]¶	[May (3) your soul make for you invocation offerings of bread, beer, beef, and fowl,] libations and incense during the course [of every day. Your flesh is on] <your> bones, made like your form on earth. May you drink with [your throat. May you eat with your mouth. May you receive] (4) offerings with [the souls of the gods. May] Anubis [protect] you and may he guard you. [You] shall not be turned back from the gates (5) [of the hereafter]. May the twice [great] and mighty [Thoth,] Lord of Hermopolis, [come to you.] May he write for you the Document of Breathing with his own fingers. May [your] soul breathe (6) [forever. May you assume again] your form on earth among the living, having been made divine together with the souls of the gods, your heart being the heart of Re, and your limbs (7) [the limbs of the Great God.]¶	(III/3) (3) incense as prescribed (daily) [...] (bones thine) or thou being like shape thine (nature) upon earth drinkest thou with (4) (offering) bread with [...] (guard)s thee Anubis makes he protection thine there is no turning thee aside from gates (5) two0times great lord of Hermopolis write(s) he for thee book (of) breathings with fingers his own breath(est) (6) image thine upon-earth among (the) living thou being divine with (the) Spirits (of the) gods heart thine heart of Re flesh thine¶	Your ba has made invocation offerings for you consisting of bread, beer, cattle and fowl, libations and incense in the course of everyday. Your flesh is on your bones just like the shape you had on earth. You have drunk with your throat, eaten with your mouth, and received offering-cakes together with the bas of the gods. Anubis has guarded you and protected you. You have not been turned back from the gates of the Netherworld. Thoth Twice Great, the Great, Lord of Hermopolis has come to you to write for you a Breathing Permit with his own fingers, that your ba may breathe forever. You have assumed again the shape you had on earth among the living. You are divine together with the bas of the gods. Your heart is the heart of Re, and your body is the body of the Great God.¶
6	[Hail, Os]iris Hôr, the justified! Amon is with you every day in the Estate of Re, so that you might live again. Wepwawet has opened for you the good way, (IV/8) [so that you might see with your eyes, that you might hear with] your ears, that you might speak with your mouth, and that you might walk with your feet, while your ba-spirit is deified in the Underworld [in order to] make (IV/9) [any] transformation[s according to its will. May you cause the rust]lings of the noble persea tree [...] in Heliopolis. May you awake every day so that you might see the ray[s (IV/10) of the sun. Amon has come to you bearing the brea]th of life. He has caused that you brea[the in] your sarcophagus so that you might go forth to the earth every day. (IV/11) The [Breath]ing Docu[ment of Thoth] has been made for you [as] your protection, so that you might breathe by means of it like Re, so that your eyes might see the rays of the sun disk, and so that you might be called 'justified' (IV/12) [in the presence of Osiris.] [Your] pro[tection(?)] has been made. Horus the Behdedite has guarded your body and has deified your ba-spirit as do all the gods. The ba-spirit of Re revivifies your [ba-spirit]. (IV/13)[The ba-spirit of Shu unites with] your [nos]trils.¶	O Osiris] Hor, justified. Amon is with you every day in the House of Re. May you live again. May Wepwawet open for you the beautiful path. (8) [May you see with your eyes, hear with your] ears, speak with your mouth, and walk with your legs, your soul having been made divine in the hereafter [so that it can assume (9) any] form [it desires.¶ May you cause] the rustlings(?) of the noble Ished tree in Heliopolis. May you awake every day and see the rays (10) [of] the [sun.¶ May Amon come to you bearing the breath] of life. May he cause you to breathe [in] your coffin. May you go forth to the earth every day. May the Document (11) [of Breathing of Thoth be made for you for] your protection. May you breathe by means of it like Re. May your eye see the rays of the (sun's) disk.¶ May they speak truth concerning you (12) [in the presence of Osiris. May "justified" be written upon your body. May Horus, the Avenger] of His Father, (even) Horus of Edfu, protect your body, and may he cause your soul to be divine like all the gods do, while the soul of Re is animating [your soul] and (13) [the soul of Shu is surrounding] your [nos]trils.¶	(III/7) (the) Osiris Hor justified Amon (is) beside thee day every in house (of) Re repeat thou life opens to thee Wepwawet (8)(2) ears thine speakest thou with mouth thine walkest thou with 2 legs thine is Ba thine divine in (the) Duat whisperings (or splittings) of the Ished-tree twice-noble in Heliopolis awakened art thou [or reflexive] every-day seest thou the rays (10) (breath)s of life causes he to make breath(ing) (in) coffin thine goest up thou to earth every-day, given to thee writ(ings) (11) protection thine breathest thou by (in) it like Re sees eye thine rays (of) Aton; they say truth to (concerning thee or: they call the [sic for "thee"]) Maat (12)(avenger of) father his Horus (of) Edfu has enfolded body being about to deify spirit thine as do gods all. Ba of Re shall cause to live (two) nostrils thine¶	O Osiris Hôr ..., Amon is with you every day ... in the Temple of Re so that you may live again. Wepwawet has opened the good way for you. You have seen with your eyes, heard with your ears, spoken with your mouth, and walked with your feet. Your ba is divine in the Netherworld, so that it can assume any form it wishes. You have scattered the Noble Ished-tree in Heliopolis. You have awakened every day and seen the rays of the sun. Amon has come to you bringing the breath of life to let you breathe in your sarcophagus. You have gone out to the earth every day. The Breathing Permit of Thoth has been made as a protection for you that you may breathe by means of it like Re. Your eye has seen the rays of the sun's disk. You have been declared just before Osiris ... Horus of Edfu has protected your body and made your ba divine as all the other gods do. The ba of Re revives your ba; the ba of Shu enters your nostrils.¶
7	Hail, Osiris Hôr, the justified, born of Taikhibit, the justified! May your ba-spirit breathe wherever it likes, (V/1) since you exist as [Osiris. Osiris Foremost of the Westerners is your name. Hapy the great (the Nile Inundation) has come to you from Elephantine, so that he might fill your altar with (V/2) food offering]s.¶	O Osiris Hor, justified, born of Taykhebyt, justified. May your soul breathe [anyplace you want.] 4.(1) You [are] on [the throne of Osiris. Foremost of the Westerners is your name. The Great Hapy has come to you from Elephantine to fill your offering table with provisions.]¶	(III/13) Hail Osiris Hor justified born of Taykhebyt justified breathes ba thine unto (IV/1) (illegible)¶	O Osiris Hôr ..., your ba has breathed everywhere you wished, for you have the attributes of Osiris. Osiris Foremost-of-the-Westerners is your name. The Great Inundation has come to you from Elephantine that it might fill your altar with provisions.¶
8	Osiris Hôr, the justified, born of [Taikhibit, the justified! The gods of Upper and Lower Egypt have come to you so that they might guide you to Alkhah. May your ba-spirit live, may you] (V/3) serve Osiris, may you breathe within Rostau. ["She-who-hides-her-Lord" and the great god have protected you. Your corpse lives in] (V/4) Busiris and the Thinite nome. Your ba-spirit lives in heaven every [day].¶	[Osiris Hor, (2)justified, born of Taaykhebyt, justified. May the gods of Upper and Lower Egypt come to you and guide you to the Alchaᑦa together with your soul. May] you [accompany] (3) Osiris and may you breathe within Rostau. [May Hapetnebes protect you together with the Great God, while your body is living] (4) in Busiris and the Thinite nome, and your soul is living in heaven every day.¶	(IV/3) (illegible) (3)(followest) thou Osiris breathest thou in Rostau (4) in Busiris (of) Thinite nome ba thine lives in heaven every-(day)	O Osiris Hôr ..., your ba has breathed everywhere you wished, for you have the attributes of Osiris. Osiris Foremost-of-the-Westerners is your name. The Great Inundation has come to you from Elephantine that it might fill your altar with provisions.¶
9	[Osiris Hôr, the justified, born of Taikhibit, the justified! Sakhmet has overpowered those who would conspire against you. Horus] (V/5) the steadfast makes (your) protection. Horus the Behdedite [performs your wishes. Hormerty guards your body, so that you are permanently in] (V/6) life, prosperity and health, enduring upon your throne in the sacred land. Come, [then, Osiris Hôr, the justified, born of Taikhibit, the justified,] (V/7) appearing gloriously in your proper form, complete in your ornaments! May you spend the night in life; [may you spend the day in health. May you travel and may you breathe] (V/8) in any place. May Re shine upon your cavern like that of Osiris, so that you might breathe and [live by means of his rays. Amon-Re has revivified] (V/9) your ka-spirit and has made you flourish by means of the Breathing Document. May you serve Osiris [and Horus, Lord of the Henu-bark since you exist as the Great God, Foremost] (V/10) of the gods. May your face live; may you enter into the very great embalming [booth] (V/11) in Busiris. May you see the Foremost of the Westerners in the Wag-Festival. May your scent be sweet as a youth. [May your name be great as] (V/12) an august noble.¶	[Osiris Hor, justified, born of Taykhebyt, justified. May Sekhmet have power over those who conspire against you, while Horus,] (5) Great of Hearts, is protecting you, Horus of Edfu [is doing what you want, and Horus of the Two Eyes is guarding your body. May you endure in] (6) life, prosperity, and health, having been established upon your throne in the Sacred Land.¶ [Come now Osiris Hor, justified, born of Taykhebyt, justified. You] (7)have arisen in your form, complete in your royal regalia. May you be established in life. [May you spend your time in health. May you walk and breathe] (8) anywhere. May Re shine in your cave like (he did upon) Osiris. May [you] breathe [and live on his rays.¶ May Amon animate] (9) your ka, may it live, prosper, and be healthy. May the Document of Breathing cause you to flourish. May you accompany Osiris and [Horus, Lord of the Henu boat. You are the Great God,] (10) Foremost among the Gods. May your face live and your form be beautiful, while your name endures every day. May you enter into the god's [very] great hall (11) in Busiris, and may you see the Foremost of the Westerners at the Wag festival. May your odor be as pleasant as a young man's. [May your name be as great as] (12) an august noble.¶	(IV/5) great (or of greatness) of heart is making protection(s) Horus the Behdetite (6) life-prosperity-health thou being firm upon throne thine in land holy (7) risen-in-glory thou in form-thine proper natural in adornments thine prepared (slept) hast thou in life (8) to place every. Shines Re upon top-place thine as (for) Osiris. Breathes (9) Ka thine living and protecting [or: may it live, be prosperous, be healthy!] Made to flourish art thou in (by) Book (of) Breathing(s), followest-thou Osiris (10) (of the gods) living face-thine fair offspring-thine, name-thine flourishes every-day enterest thou into (the gods' domain) (11) in Busiris seest-thou head, chief president (of) the West in festival Wag- (i.e. Wag-festival) pleasant odor thine as (or, together with) youths (12) noble (elect) august one.¶	Osiris Hôr ..., Sekhmet has prevailed over those that plotted against you. Horus the Steadfast protects [you]. Horus of Edfu carries out your wishes. Hormeti guards your body. Your life, prosperity, and health have become permanent, and you will remain in your position in the Sacred Land. Come, Osiris Hôr ..., for you have appeared in your glorious form, and your appurtenances are complete. You have spent the night alive and the day in health. You have gone and breathe everywhere. Re has shined on your cavern as he did on that of Osiris, that you might breathe and live by his rays. Amon-Re has caused your ka to live and made you flourish by means of the Breathing Permit. You have accompanied Osiris and Horus, the Lord of the Henu-bark, for you have the attributes of the Great God, the Foremost of Gods. Your face is alert and your form perfect. Your name endures always. Come, that you may enter the Great Divine Council in Busiris! That you may see the Foremost of the Westerners at the Wag-festival. Your smell is pleasant like that of a young man, and your reputation is as great as that of a functionary of high rank.¶
10	Hail, Osiris Hôr, the justified! May your ba-spirit live by means of the Breathing Document, [and may you be united by the same manner with] (V/13) the ba-spirit. May you enter into the Underworld. There are no enemies of yours, for you exist as a divine, effective spirit [in Busiris. Your heart belongs to you; it will not be far from you. Your eyes belong to you, being open every day.]¶	O Osiris Hor, justified. May your soul live by means of the Document of Breathing. [May you join with] (13) <your> soul. May you enter into the hereafter without your enemy. You are a divine soul [in Busiris. You have your heart. It will not be far from you.]¶	(IV/12) Hail Osiris Hor justified lives ba thine in book of breathing(s) (13) spirit. Enterest thou into Duat (do) not exist enemies thine thou-being as (a) ba divine¶	O Osiris Hôr ..., your ba lives by means of the Breathing Permit, and you have joined the ba by the same means. You have entered the Netherworld. You have no enemies, for you are a divine akh in Busiris. You have possession of your heart; it will not leave you. You have possession of your eyes, which are open every day.¶

The translation from the papyri ends here, as the remaining fragments is presumed not to have survived. The Book of Breathing continues for another four paragraphs (paragraphs 11–14). These final paragraphs typically include continued discussion of Hôr entering the afterlife, an abbreviated Negative Confession where Hôr would proclaim before gods and demons that he had not committed a variety of sins, and finally a proclamation of the Hôr's purity and readiness to live forever on earth. This would make up about two more columns.

=== Closing Vignette (Facsimile #3) ===
Atef crown worn by Osiris

The culminating vignette, also known as facsimile #3, is the presentation of Hor to the Egyptian god of death and rebirth Osiris (seated), and his wife Isis (standing) after having been judged worthy to continue existence. Hor is adorned in Egyptian festival attire with a cone of perfumed grease and a lotus flower on his head. He is escorted by the goddess of justice Ma'at, and guide of the dead Anubis. At the top of the scene is a row of stars, representing the sky. The presentation of the deceased to Osiris is a common scene in Egyptian funerary literature, and has its antecedent in chapter 125 of the earlier Book of the Dead.

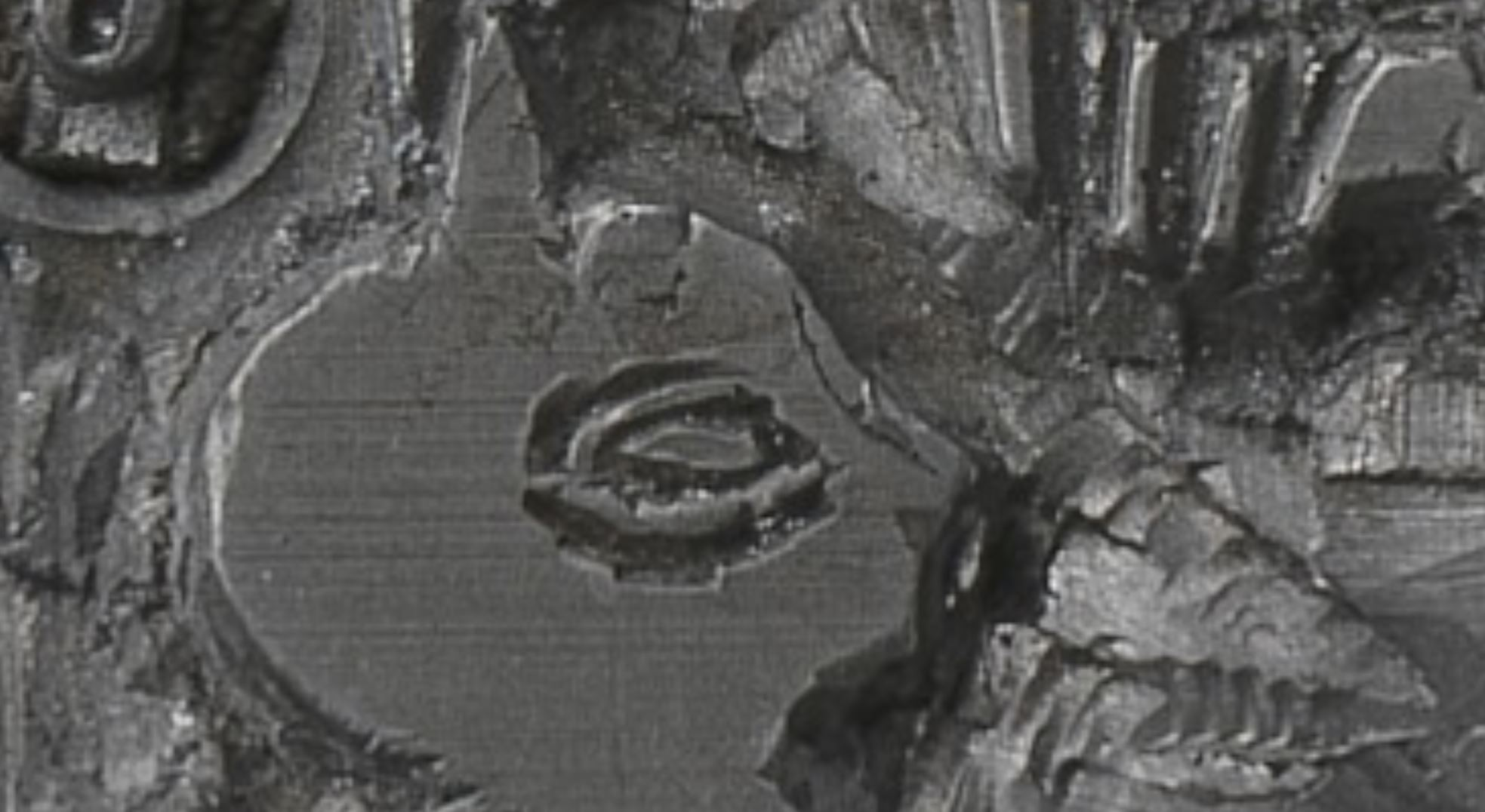
Anubis from the original printing plate, where it appears that the nose was scraped off.

The Egyptian gods and goddesses in this vignette are identified by iconography above their heads. Osiris is adorned in the crown Atef which combines the Hedjet, the crown of Upper Egypt (where Thebes is located), with two ostrich feathers on the side. Isis has a sun disk between two cows horns above her head, and in her hand is a symbol of life called an Ankh. Ma'at is denoted by a feather above her head.

In Egyptian funerary tradition, the god Anubis is a guide to the dead, assisting in leading the deceased through the underworld. Anubis is typically portrayed with a jackal's head to include spiked ears, narrow eyes and long snout. While the spiked ear, and narrow eyes are present, the long snout is not. Close analysis of the printing plates of facsimile 3 indicates that the snout might have been present but chiseled off.

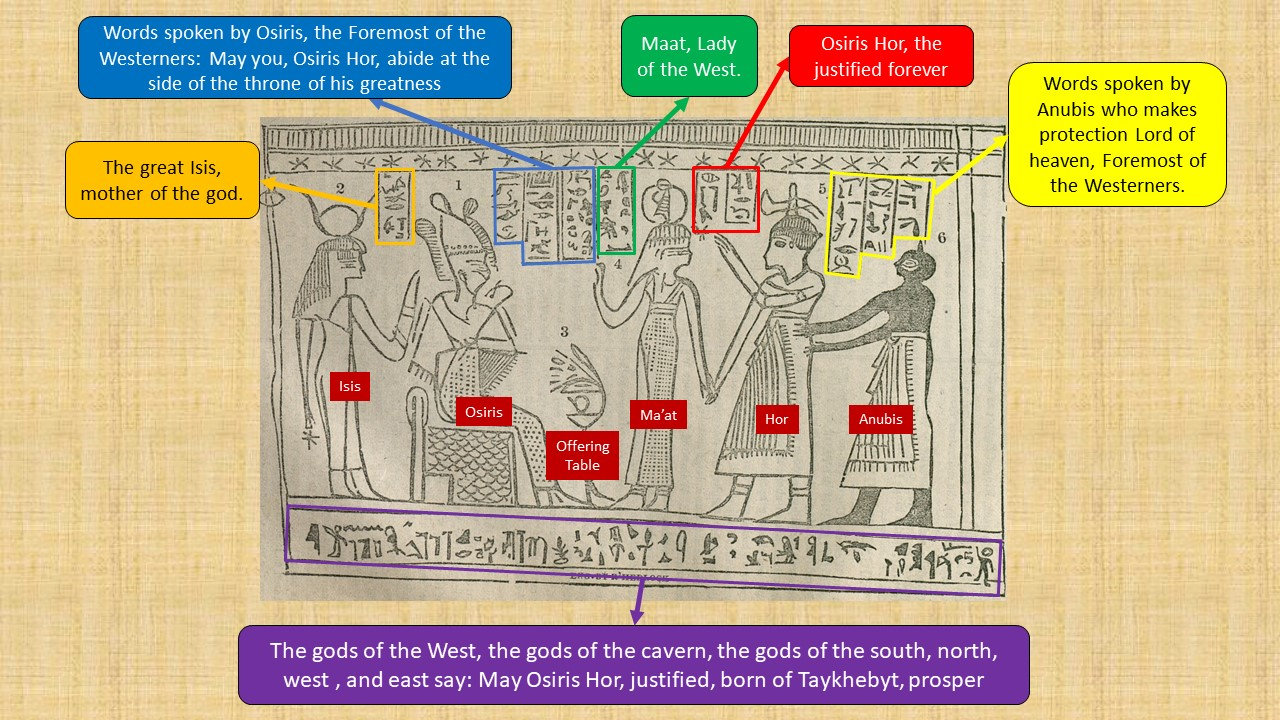
Translation of Book of Abraham Facsimile #3. The translation was done by LDS Church scholar Michael Rhodes

Interestingly, the invocation to Osiris at the bottom of the vignette reads from left to right, not right to left, and indicates the direction the prayer was going (from the direction of Hor/Anubis, to Osiris)

Closing Vignette: Presentation of Hor the justified to Osiris
Section of Vignette	Ritner (2010)	Rhodes (2002)	Baer (1975)	Joseph Smith (1842)
Label for Osiris; Figure 1	(VIII/1) Recitation by Osiris, Foremost of the Westerners, (VIII/2) Lord of Abydos(?), the great god (VIII/3) forever and ever (?).	(1) Words spoken by Osiris, the Foremost of the Westerners: (2) May you, Osiris Hor, abide at (3) the side of the throne of his greatness.		Abraham sitting upon Pharaoh's throne, by the politeness of the king, with a crown upon his head, representing the Priesthood, as emblematical of the grand Presidency in Heaven; with the scepter of justice and judgment in his hand.
Label for Isis; Figure 2	(VIII/4) Isis the great, the god's mother.	The great Isis, mother of the god.		King Pharaoh, whose name is given in the characters above his head.
Offering Stand; Figure 3			an offering-stand, with a jug and some flowers on it.	Signifies Abraham in Egypt as given also in Figure 10 of Facsimile No. 1.
Label for Maat; Figure 4	(VIII/5) Maat, mistress of the gods.	MaꜤat, Lady of the West.		Prince of Pharaoh, King of Egypt, as written above the hand.
Label for Hôr; Figure 5	(VIII/6) The Osiris Hôr, (VIII/7) justified forever.	(1) Osiris Hor, the (2) justified forever.	Osiris Hôr, justified forever.	Shulem, one of the king's principal waiters, as represented by the characters above his hand.
Label for Anubis; Figure 6	(VIII/8) Recitation by Anubis, who makes protection, (VIII/9) foremost of the embalming booth (?) (VIII/10) ...	(1) Words spoken by Anubis who makes protection (2) Lord of heaven, Foremost of (3) the Westerners.		Olimlah, a slave belonging to the prince.
Bottom line	(VIII/11) O gods of the necropolis, gods of the caverns, gods of the south, north, west and east, grant salvation to the Osiris Hôr, the justified, born by Taikhibit.	The gods of the West, the gods of the cavern, the gods of the south, north, west, and east say: May Osiris Hor, justified, born of Taykhebyt, prosper.	O gods of ..., gods of the Caverns, gods of the south, north, west, and east, grant well-being to Osiris Hôr, justified, ...	
