= Bernardino Drovetti =

Italian diplomat, explorer and scholar

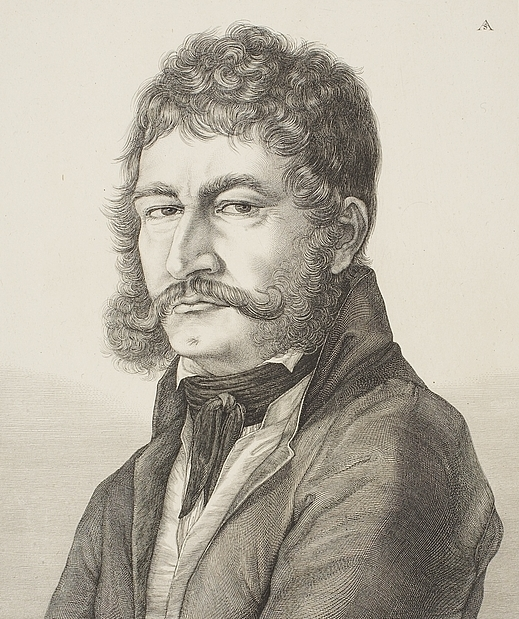

French Consul-General in Egypt
- In office 27 October 1802 – November 1815
- Monarch: Napoleon
- Preceded by: Mathieu de Lesseps
- Succeeded by: Joseph Roussel

French Consul-General in Egypt
- In office 1821–1829
- Monarchs: Louis XVIII; Charles X of France
- Preceded by: Alexandre Pillavoine
- Succeeded by: Jean François Mimaut

Personal details
- Born: January 7, 1776 Barbania, Turin, Kingdom of Sardinia
- Died: March 5, 1852 (aged 76) Turin, Kingdom of Sardinia
- Spouse: Rosa Balthalon
- Children: One son
- Profession: Antiquities collector, diplomat, politician

Bernardino Michele Maria Drovetti (January 7, 1776 – March 5, 1852) was an Italian collector of antiquities, diplomat, and Egyptologist. He is best remembered for having acquired the Turin Royal Canon and for his vast collection of ancient Egyptian antiquities.

== Biography ==
Born in Barbania, a comune near Turin in the kingdom of Piedmont-Sardinia, Drovetti later obtained French nationality and joined the French army, eventually rising to the rank of Chef d'escadron. As an official, during the French campaign in Egypt (1798–99) he distinguished himself by saving the life of Joachim Murat, and later he became the French Consul-General of Egypt during both the Empire (until 1814) and the Bourbon Restoration, between 1820 and 1829. He also earned Wāli Muhammad Ali's trust and had a role in some of the latter's administrative reforms. In 1820, he was awarded the title of Chevalier dans l'Ordre de la Legion d'Honneur.

During his stay in Egypt, Drovetti became a passionate and avid collector of Egyptian antiquities. He engaged several agents and was particularly active in Luxor; shortly he gathered huge amounts of findings which he managed to sell in Europe. His first collection was refused by France, but was acquired by King Charles Felix of Sardinia in 1824 and carried to Turin, where it became the first core of the future Museo Egizio. Another collection was purchased by King Charles X of France and is now stored at the Louvre. A third one was acquired by Karl Richard Lepsius in 1836 and carried in Prussia in order of being accommodated in the Egyptian Museum of Berlin. Among the antiquities sold to the King of Sardinia, there was the invaluable Turin Royal Canon, a papyrus bearing a list of several pharaohs which is datable to the reign of Ramesses II and which was found by Drovetti at Luxor in 1820.

Later in his life, Drovetti lost his mind and was confined in a lunatic asylum at Turin. He died there on March 5, 1852.

== Legacy ==
While he contributed significantly to the creation of three of the largest Egyptological collections in Europe and substantially increased the European interest in ancient Egypt, Drovetti is also remembered for his ruthlessness towards other collectors and excavators. He was particularly hostile against Henry Salt, Giovanni Battista Belzoni and Jean-François Champollion: for example, during his excavations at Luxor around 1818 and later, Belzoni reported to have been harassed by two of Drovetti's agents, Antonio Lebolo and a certain Rosignani; Drovetti also tried several times to hinder Champollion's expedition in Egypt (1827–28), likely to prevent a competitor in his affairs. Drovetti and his agents were also deemed careless and unscrupulous in their conduct towards their discoveries, and it is believed that the fragmentary state of the Turin Royal Canon is at least partially due to this behaviour.

== In popular culture ==
Drovetti was portrayed by Joseph Long in the 2005 BBC docudrama Egypt.

== See also ==
- List of Egyptologists

== Sources and further reading ==
- Dawson, Warren R. (1951). Who Was Who in Egyptology. London: Harrison & sons (reprint 1972).
- Silvio Curto; Laura Donatelli, eds. (1985). Bernardino Drovetti: epistolario. Milan: Istituto Editoriale Cisalpino-La Goliardica.
- Ridley, Ronald T. (1998). Napoleon's Proconsul In Egypt: The Life and Times of Bernardino Drovetti. London: Rubicon Press. ISBN 0-948695-59-5.
- Ridley, Ronald T. (1992). "DROVETTI, Bernardino". Dizionario Biografico degli Italiani (in Italian). Vol. 41: Donaggio–Dugnani. Rome: Institute of the Italian Encyclopaedia. ISBN 978-88-12-00032-6.
