= Foreordination =

Mormon theological doctrine

Foreordination is an important doctrine of the Church of Jesus Christ of Latter-day Saints (LDS Church). It teaches that during the pre-mortal existence, God selected ("foreordained") particular people to fulfill certain missions ("callings") during their mortal lives. For example, prophets were foreordained to be the Lord's servants, all who receive the priesthood were foreordained to that calling, and Jesus Christ was foreordained to enact the atonement.

Unlike predestination, foreordination allows for individual agency (the ability to choose whether to fulfil one's callings).

== Teachings ==
Foreordination is a prominent part of LDS theology. Brigham Young, the first LDS Church leader to explain it, taught that God's omniscient foreknowledge does not constitute a divine decree. Unlike predestination, foreordination does not exclude free will. LDS Church members believe part of one's mission in life is choosing to fulfill what one was foreordained to do, following the example of Jesus Christ who actively chose to complete the atonement he was foreordained to enact.

The word "foreordination" appears in the King James Version of the First Epistle of Peter 1:20, "Who verily was foreordained before the foundation of the world, but was manifest in these last times for you". The LDS Church has understood this to be a depiction of Christ's foreordination. The church also teaches that foreordination is referenced in the Old Testament in the first chapter of the Book of Jeremiah, verse 5 ("before thou camest forth out of the womb I sanctified thee, and I ordained thee a prophet").

The church also teaches that during the War in Heaven the spirits that followed Christ were not equally valiant. The more diligent ones were made to be rulers. The Book of Abraham teaches that in the pre-mortal existence some spirits were more intelligent than others. The church teaches that foreordination can be a reward for valiant commitment to Jesus Christ and may influence one's earthly circumstances. Birth into one of the Twelve Tribes of Israel is seen as a birthright of dedicated souls. Those who are virtuous and great in this life attained greater intelligence and nobility in the pre-mortal existence. However, everyone can be adopted into one of the twelve tribes of Israel through faithfulness on Earth, regardless of their foreordination.

=== Time of birth ===
In 1918, Joseph F. Smith said he received a vision, in which he was told choice spirits were reserved to be born during the founding of the LDS Church, including Joseph Smith, Hyrum Smith, Brigham Young, John Taylor, and Wilford Woodruff, and that they received lessons in the spirit world and were prepared to be rulers in the LDS Church. This was later adapted as the 138th section of the Doctrine and Covenants.

In a 1977 speech, Ezra Taft Benson told the young people of the church, "You are choice spirits, many of you having been held back in reserve for almost 6,000 years to come forth in this day." In 1986, he told young men and women, "Your birth at this particular time was foreordained in the eternities." These comments were later incorporated into a pamphlet for youth. In the 1990 "For the Strength of Youth" pamphlet, the First Presidency told Latter-day Saint youth, "You are choice spirits who have been held in reserve to come forth in this day when the temptations, responsibilities, and opportunities are the very greatest." This was part of a larger church effort to promote the peculiarity of LDS youth. The 2001 version changed the wording to remove the concept of holding in reserve, saying, "You are choice spirits who have come forth in this day when the responsibilities and opportunities, as well as the temptations, are the greatest." In 2004, the church's Young Women general president, Elaine S. Dalton, said that the current generation was among those choice spirits reserved to come to the earth.

=== Priesthood ===
The Book of Mormon teaches that those ordained to the priesthood were "called and prepared from the foundation of the world according to the foreknowledge of God, on account of their exceeding faith and good works." While traditionally this is interpreted as foreordination of priesthood holders, some have interpreted this to mean the standard of worthiness was foreordained rather than the priesthood holders. The Book of Abraham teaches that in the pre-mortal existence God chose certain spirits that were noble and great to be rulers. "Joseph Smith taught that "Every man who has a calling to minister to the inhabitants of the world was ordained to that very purpose in the grand council of heaven before this world was." The church teaches that all members of the church were foreordained with significant tasks.

== See also ==
- Agency (LDS Church) § Foreordination
