= Antonio Lebolo =

Italian adventurer and archaeologist

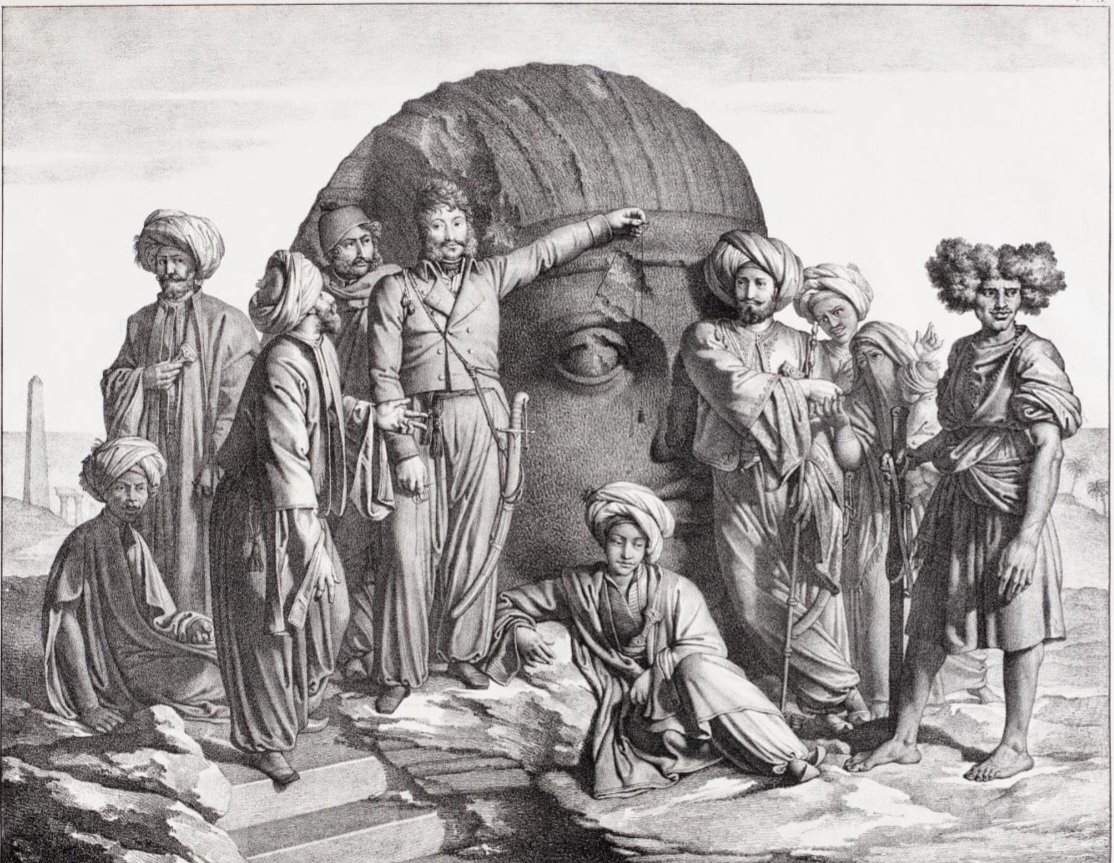
- Lebolo (the first standing from the left) with Drovetti (standing, center) in Egypt in 1819
- Born: Castellamonte, Kingdom of Piedmont-Sardinia (now Italy)
- Died: Possibly 19 February 1830; Castellamonte, Piedmont-Sardinia or Trieste, Austria-Hungary (now Italy)
- Occupations: Excavator, adventurer
- Known for: Discovery of the Joseph Smith Papyri

Antonio Lebolo (possibly died 19 February 1830) was an Italian adventurer and pioneering archaeologist. He is best remembered for discovering the Joseph Smith Papyri, a collection of documents found in an Egyptian burial site.

== Biography ==
Born in Castellamonte in the kingdom of Piedmont-Sardinia, Lebolo became a gendarme during the Napoleonic occupation of Italy; after the Restauration he fled to Egypt where he became an agent of Bernardino Drovetti, who was the French Consul-General of Egypt as well as an ardent antiquities collector. Lebolo oversaw many excavations mainly in the zone of Luxor, usually on behalf of Drovetti and sometimes for himself. He apparently was as ruthless as his boss Drovetti, as Giovanni Battista Belzoni reported during one of his excavations at Karnak in 1818 and later: along with another Piedmontese agent named Rosignani, Lebolo harassed and maybe even tried to murder Belzoni, and later managed to steal some of his finds excavated at Philae.

Between 1817 and 1821 Lebolo found a mummy cache in a shaft tomb at Sheikh Abd el-Qurna. The finest mummies were given to Drovetti and are now in the Egyptian Museum of Berlin (no. 504, 505), others were sold to Heinrich Menu von Minutoli, Giovanni Anastasi, Frédéric Cailliaud and Henry Salt; Salt placed the objects he bought in the British Museum (no. 6705, 6706, 6708 and likely 6950). Lebolo kept the remaining mummies for himself.

Lebolo died some years after these events, possibly on February 19, 1830 in Castellamonte or at an unknown date in Trieste.

== Joseph Smith Papyri ==
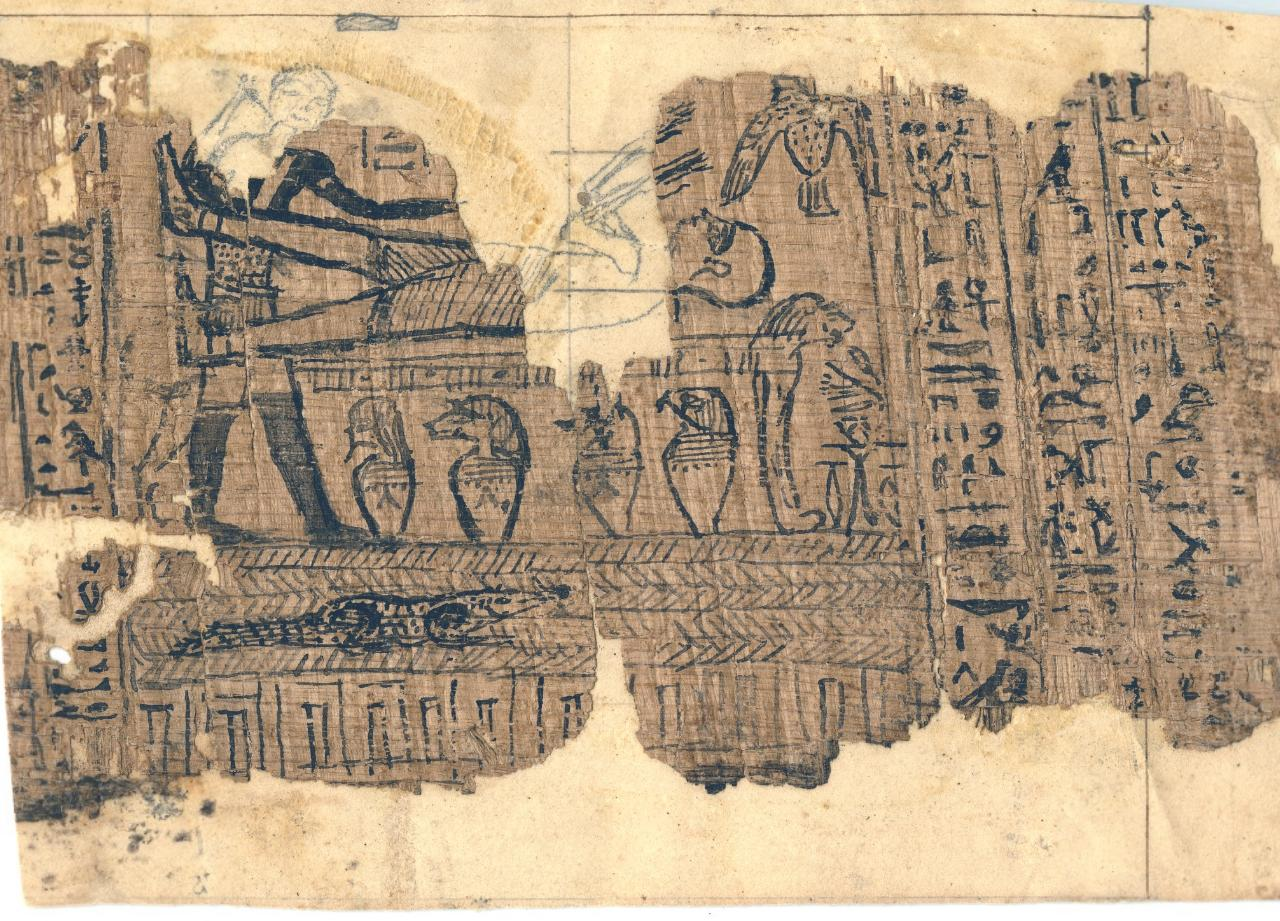
Joseph Smith Papyrus I

A few years later, a man named Michael H. Chandler claimed to be Lebolo's nephew and demanded Lebolo's goods in inheritance. In 1833 he obtained the inheritance and took the mummies and some accompanying papyri to the United States, selling them during his travels. In 1835, Chandler met Joseph Smith, the founder of Mormonism, and some of his affiliates. Since Smith claimed to be able to translate Egyptian hieroglyphs, Chandler showed him the papyri. Smith purchased the mummies and papyri, and interpreted some of the writings and scenes as some life events of the two patriarchs Abraham and Joseph. The papyri were soon called the Joseph Smith Papyri and formed the core of Smith's Book of Abraham.
