= St. Louis Museum =

The St. Louis Museum was a natural history museum located in St. Louis, Missouri. It was also known as Koch's Museum.

== Location ==
The museum was located on the third floor of Wyman's Hall on Market Street in St. Louis, Missouri, opposite the Court House. Near where this museum once stood is the current location of the Museum of Westward Expansion under the Gateway Arch.

== Museum Directors ==
According to The History of Science in St. Louis, Edward Wyman initially established the museum under the direction of J.P. Bates. Wyman collected natural history specimens for many years and was skilled in preparing and arranging the objects. Bates was also devoted to natural history, making frequent trips to Europe, South America, and the tropics to collect birds, quadrupeds, and other specimens. The museum held nearly 2500 specimens, many of which were speculated to not exist anywhere else in the country. Museum collections included curiosities from the East Indies and South Sea Islands, paintings and statuary, and minerals and shells.

In a contrasting article, The Living Museum states that Dr. Albert C. Koch opened the museum in 1836. Koch was a German immigrant from Saxony who settled in St. Louis. Koch's father was also interested in natural history and kept specimens in a cabinet in their home. In addition to Koch's scientific interests, he was also a museum proprietor with a flair for the spectacular who fostered a vaudevillelike atmosphere at the museum. He also fabricated several extraordinary skeletons from smaller remains of known species, and fraudulently displayed them as antediluvian creatures. Despite his showmanship, Koch played a significant role in scientific endeavors of the 19th century and his museum contained many important natural history collections.

== Collections ==
Among the collections at the St. Louis Museum were a collection of American Indian costumes, weapons, pipes, instruments, and other items collected by General William Clark during his explorations of the Mississippi River with Meriweather Lewis. It is thought that Koch took possession of these items upon Clark's death. A second notable collection at the museum contained hundreds of fossils including one of the American mastodon. The fossils came from many locations, but most of them were discovered at three locations in Missouri. It was during excavations at Pomme de Terre River in Missouri between 1838 and 1840 that Koch found what came to be called the Missouri Leviathan, or Missourium. It was larger than an elephant with unique tusks. Later, anatomists found that this newly discovered specimen was merely a misassembled mastodon skeleton with a number of extra bones.

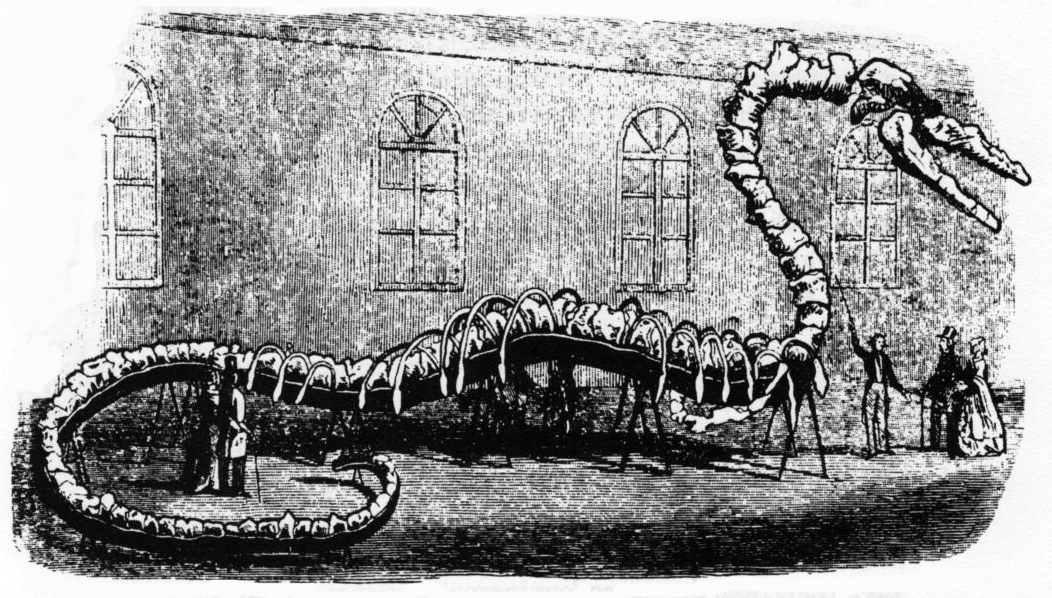
A contemporary drawing of Koch's "hydrarchos" or Zeugledon

A museum specimen of particular note was a fossil, the Hydrarchos or Zeuglodon, which the Complete Guide to the St. Louis Museum called "the greatest fossil in the world." The Zeuglodon was constructed mainly from basilosaurus fossils discovered in 1848 in a field in Alabama. After they were extricated from the rock in which they were found, Dr. Koch purchased the fossils for the St. Louis Museum. The fossils were shown to Yale chemist Benjamin Silliman, likely before being rearranged by Koch. Silliman, who had recently lectured on the basilosaurus, wrote a letter to Koch about his find. A broadside promoting the exhibit took Silliman's letter out of context and presented the hydrarchus as "Leviathan of the Antediluvian World". Professor Joseph Leidy also attested to the authenticity of the fossils, though it's not clear if he saw them before or after Koch's rearrangement. Professor Jeffries Wyman eventually exposed the hoax, and Silliman wrote another letter to Koch asking not to be associated with the exhibit. The hydrarchos continued to be displayed and was taken by Koch to Dresden, where it was destroyed by Allied bombing of that city during WWII. A smaller model was destroyed in the Great Chicago Fire.

Koch spent much of his time hunting fossils, and his time away from the museum lead to declining attendance. He was disappointed in the interest in his newly discovered Missourium specimen and some encouraged him to exhibit the specimen in Europe. This caused Koch to sell the St. Louis Museum in January 1841 and he left St. Louis. Koch toured the United States with his collections and later traveled to Europe where he exhibited the Missourium in London and Dublin. He later accepted an offer from the British Museum to purchase parts of his fossil collection, including the Missourium, for 1300 pounds. Today the Missourium is still standing in the British Museum, in correct anatomical order.

With Koch's departure, the museum fell on hard times and faded into history.

== Building ==
After the museum's closure, Wyman's Hall became a concert venue and dance hall. The third floor, which housed the museum, was the city's primary concert space. The building burned down in June 1866, causing damages valued at $140,000.
