= Richard Nibley =

Fred Richard Nibley (April 29, 1913 – September 22, 1979) was an American violinist, composer, and educator. He is often cited as an expert on the influence of music on behavior.

Richard spent many years as a professor at Snow College in Ephraim, Utah. He lived in a pioneer home on Main Street in Ephraim that was originally built for Canute Peterson, an early Mormon leader in the area.

His list of the top ten classical music pieces for your music library is still used today.

Richard was born in Medford, Oregon, to Alexander Nibley and Agnes Sloan. His older brother was Hugh Nibley, and his grandfather was Charles W. Nibley. Richard Nibley's great-grandfather Alexander Neibaur was the first Jew to join the LDS Church.

He died in the fall of 1979 of amyotrophic lateral sclerosis (commonly known as Lou Gehrig's disease).

== Quote ==
"Music creates atmosphere. Atmosphere creates environment. Environment influences behavior."
