= Canute Peterson House =

Historic house in Utah, United States

- U.S. National Register of Historic Places
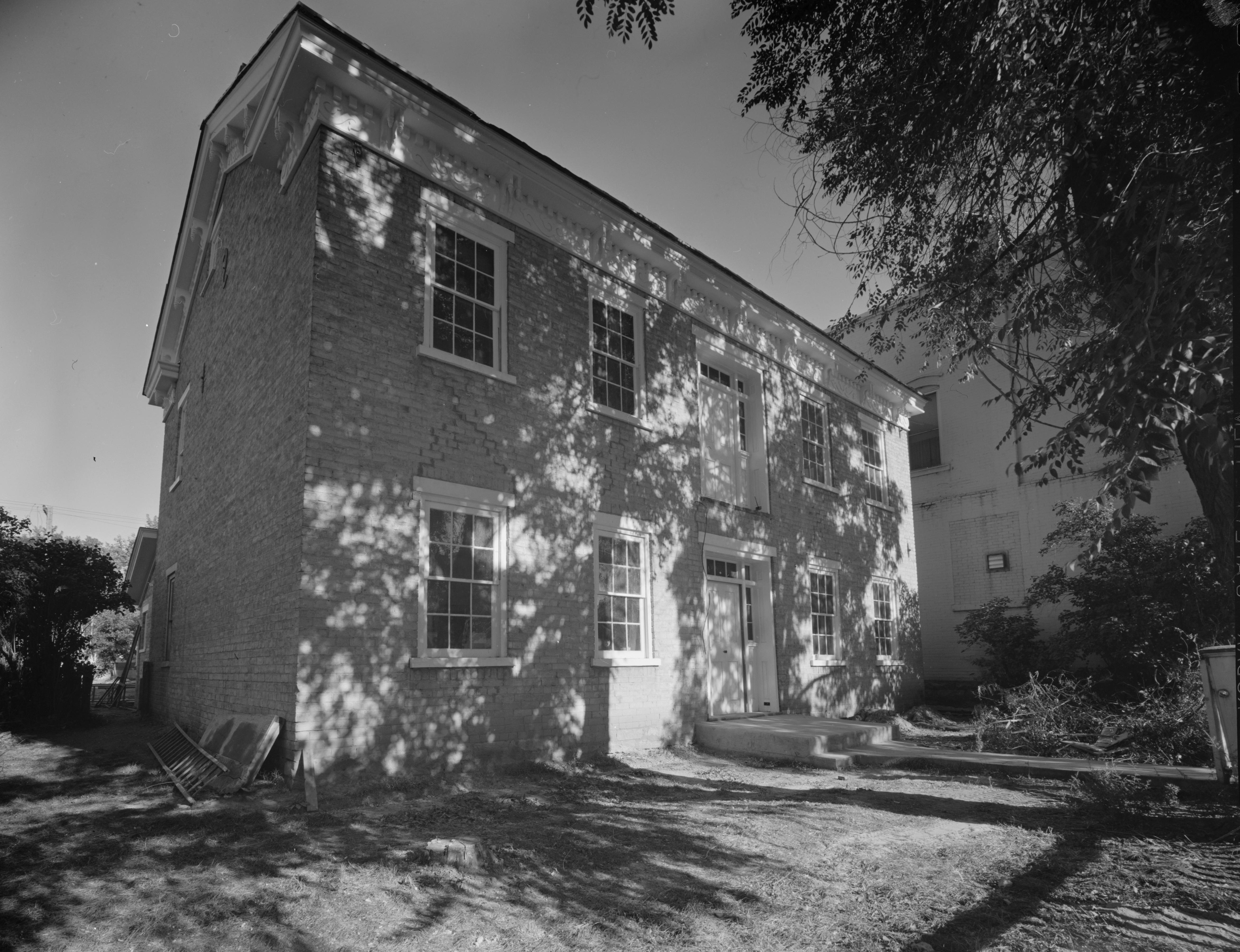
- Front and side of the house

- Location within Utah Location within the United States
- Location: 10 North Main Street; Ephraim. Utah; United States
- Coordinates: 39°21′48″N 111°35′12″W
- Built: 1869
- Architect: William H. Folsom
- Architectural style: Federal, Vernacular
- NRHP reference No.: 78002689
- Added to NRHP: July 17, 1978

The Canute Peterson House is a historic residence in Ephraim, Utah, United States. In 1978, it was listed on the National Register of Historic Places.

== Description ==
Built in 1869 by Canute Peterson, an early Latter-day Saint leader in Sanpete County, it was designed by architect William H. Folsom.

Richard Nibley, brother of Mormon scholar Hugh Nibley, purchased and restored the home in the 1960s. For a time it was a bed and breakfast. However, in 2014, Cache Valley Bank (directly south) purchased and incorporated the old home into the newly constructed bank building. It is restored and open to the public for tours Monday-Friday 8:30 am – 5:00 pm.

== See also ==
- National Register of Historic Places listings in Sanpete County, Utah
