= Provo Tabernacle =

Historic church in Utah, United States

- U.S. National Register of Historic Places
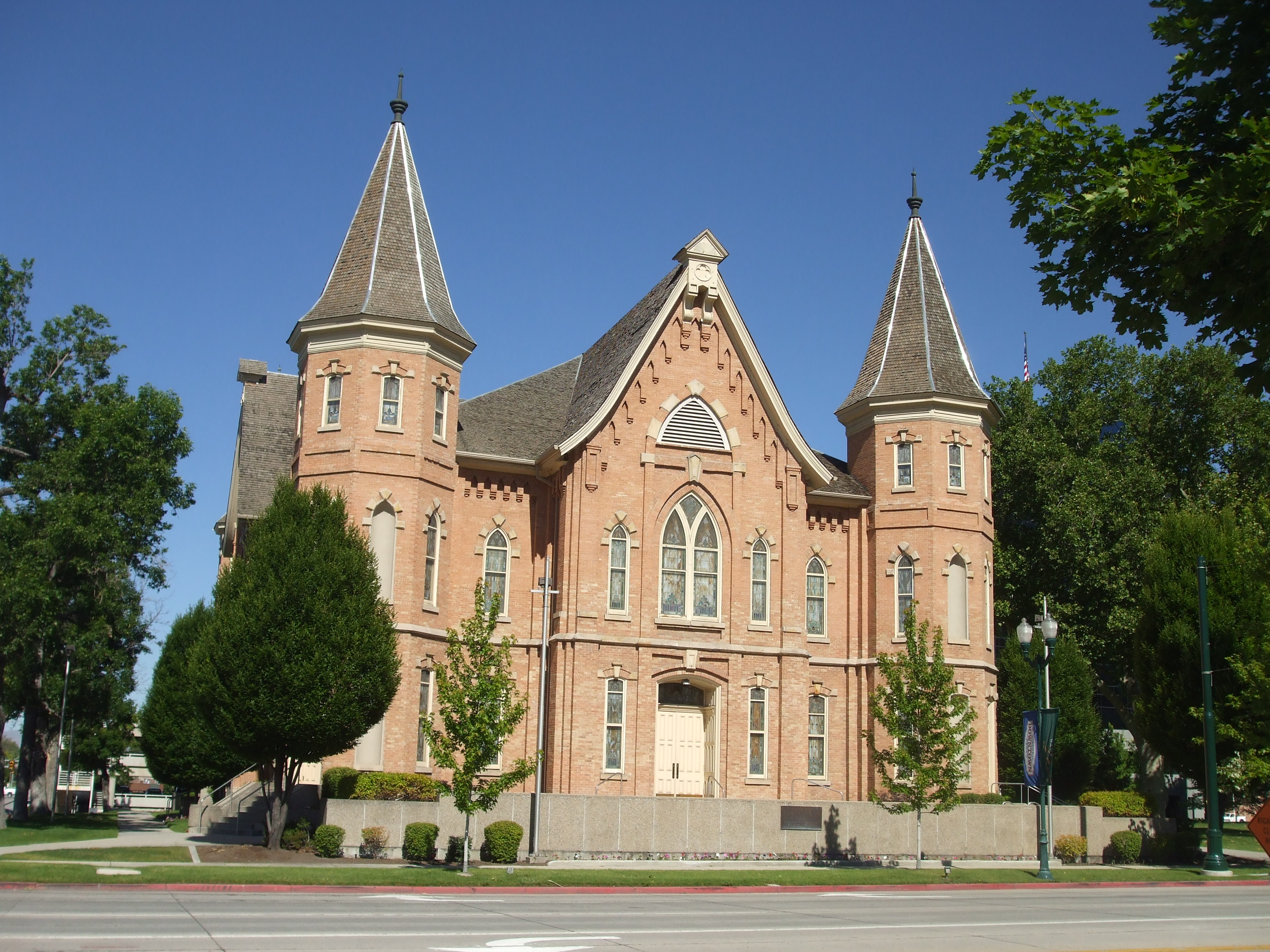
- The Provo Tabernacle in 2009

- Location within Utah Location within the United States
- Location: 50 S. University Ave., Provo, Utah
- Coordinates: 40°13′57.5″N 111°39′33″W
- Area: 1 acre (0.40 ha)
- Built: 1883
- Architect: William H. Folsom
- Architectural style: Gothic Revival
- NRHP reference No.: 75001830
- Added to NRHP: September 9, 1975

The Provo Tabernacle was a tabernacle of the Church of Jesus Christ of Latter-day Saints (LDS Church) from 1898 to 2010 in downtown Provo, Utah, United States. It was a historic icon of Provo and had been home to many religious and cultural events. All but the outer walls of the building were destroyed by fire in December 2010. The LDS Church preserved the remaining outer walls and built a new foundation and interior as part of the Provo City Center Temple, completed in 2016.

== First tabernacle in Provo ==
Predating the existing Provo tabernacle was a smaller tabernacle (sometimes called the Old Provo Tabernacle or simply the Old Meetinghouse) that stood from 1861 to 1919 on the same block and was situated north of the later tabernacle building facing Center Street. Plans for the first tabernacle began as early as 1852, though ground wasn't broken until 1856. The Walker and Utah wars slowed the progress of building the original structure. Thomas Allman and John Watkins did much of the interior woodwork. The first tabernacle seated 1100, though more could fit with chairs added in the aisles. The single tower, located on the north end above the foyer, stood 80 feet (24 m) tall and carried a 500-pound (230 kg) bell. For practical purposes, the tabernacle was completed in 1861, although the final plastering and dedication of the building occurred in 1867. There is confusion as to whether Brigham Young or John Taylor dedicated the first tabernacle. At the dedication, Young expressed that the tabernacle was "entirely too small" and should have been completed 12 years previously. The original Provo tabernacle was razed between 1918 and 1919. The foundation for the first tabernacle and nearby baptismal font were unearthed by the Office of Public Archaeology at Brigham Young University (BYU) in 2012. Many coins, trinkets, and other small items that had fallen through the floorboards and remained in the foundation were discovered. The rock foundation was then disassembled and the stones were donated to Provo City.

== Construction of the second tabernacle ==
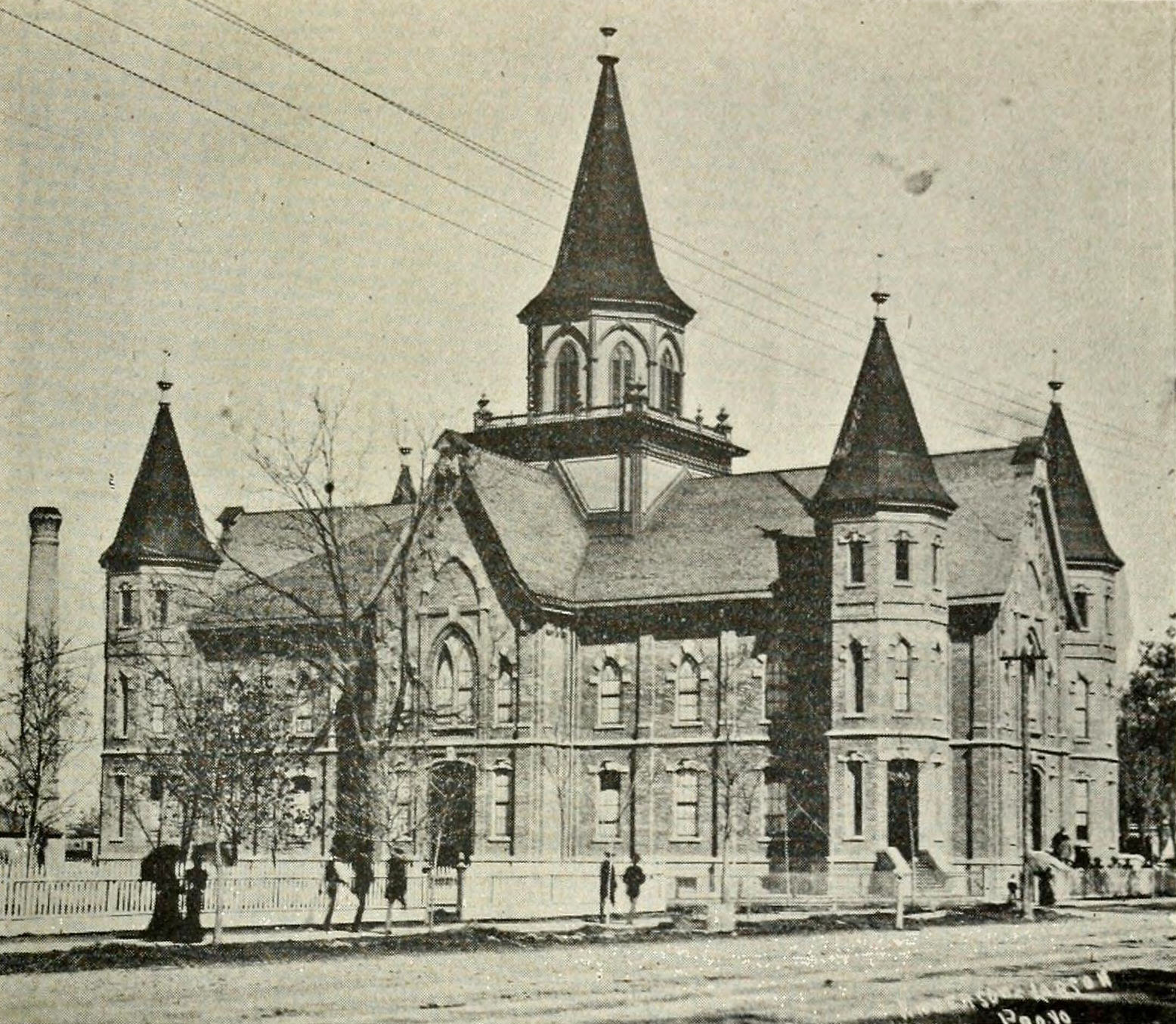
The Provo Tabernacle in 1914, before the center tower was removed.

The construction for the second and larger Provo tabernacle (referred to also as the Utah Stake Tabernacle or the New Provo Tabernacle) started in 1883. It was built by the LDS Church as a meeting place that would hold more people than its predecessor. Harvey H. Cluff oversaw its construction. The new tabernacle, designed by William H. Folsom could seat 3,000 individuals in its auditorium and balconies. The tabernacle was in use by 1886, when it held the LDS Church's general conference on April 6. Members of the First Presidency were in hiding at the time on polygamy charges and were not present. The tabernacle was dedicated on April 17, 1898, by George Q. Cannon, with church president Joseph F. Smith also in attendance. The building costs totaled US$100,000. In 1907, a US$10,000 organ from the Austin Organ Company was installed, featuring 36 ranks of pipes and 3 manuals. In 1917, the cupola was removed due to the roof sagging.

In 1964, the tabernacle was updated, with much of the interior painted white, while the electrical and heating systems were updated.

== Cultural impact ==
The Tabernacle was home to many concerts, LDS stake conferences, and other community events. One of the first big-name entertainers to perform in the tabernacle was Madame Abbie Carrington in 1891. On September 1, 1909, U.S. President William H. Taft visited and spoke in the tabernacle. In the 1930s, Herald R. Clark, the head of BYU's College of Commerce, arranged to use the tabernacle for university lyceum programs. One of the most famous lyceums occurred in 1938 when composer Sergei Rachmaninoff performed in concert. Many funerals of prominent residents of Provo were held in the tabernacle, including Abraham O. Smoot, Hugh Nibley, and Truman Madsen. In 1975, the building was added to the U.S. National Register of Historic Places.

== Fire ==
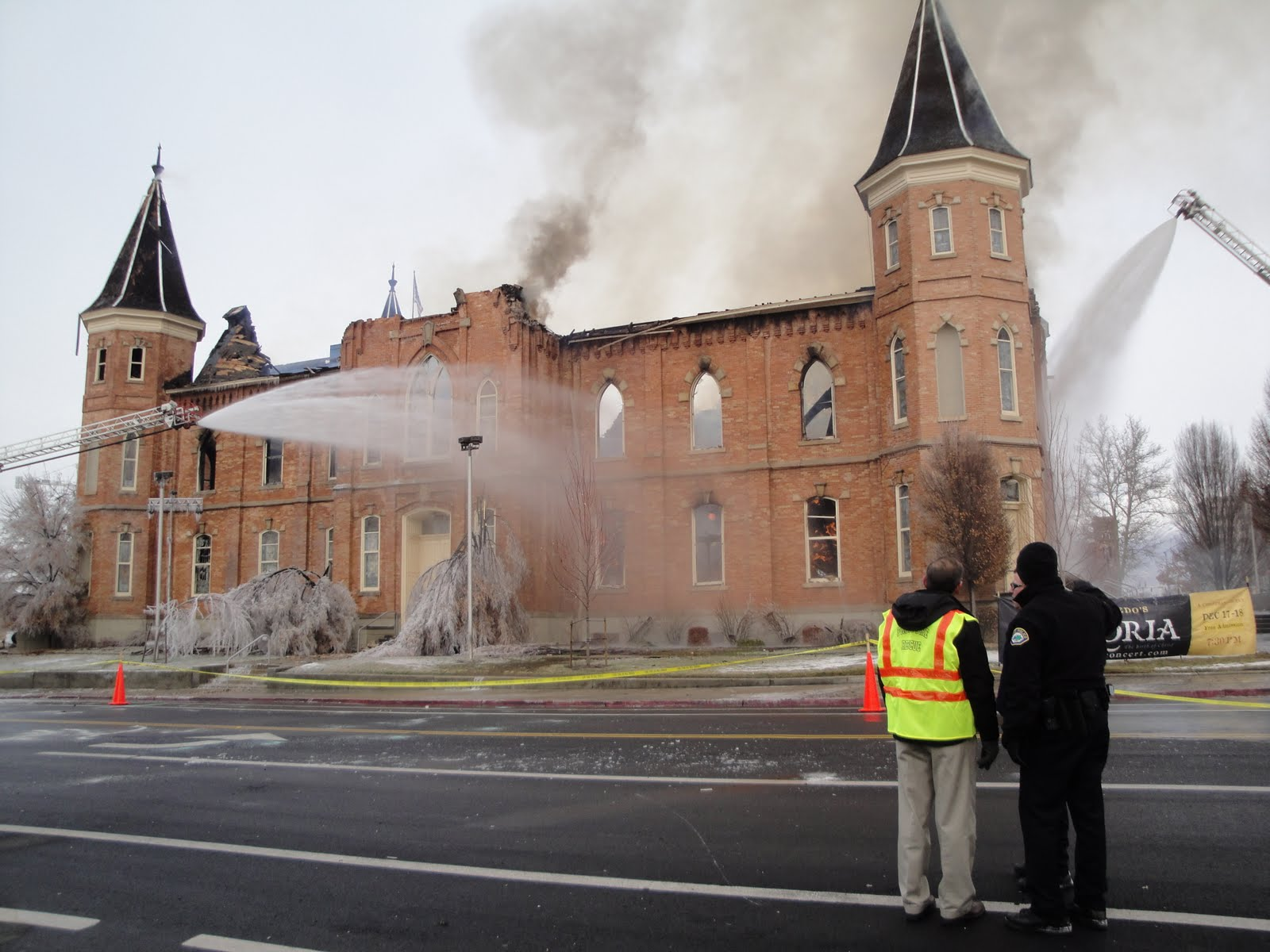
Provo Tabernacle gutted by fire on 17 December 2010

A four-alarm fire was reported at the tabernacle on December 17, 2010, at 2:43 AM MST. Firefighters arrived to find smoke coming from the building. Firefighters initially believed they could save the roof and thus the outward structural integrity of the building, but around 6:00 AM MST the roof collapsed. The fire continued to burn throughout the day.

On March 31, 2011, after 12 weeks of investigation, the Provo City Fire Department released its findings and conclusion regarding the fire. The report states "The most probable proximate cause of the fire at the Tabernacle December 17, 2010 is a heat source, specifically an energized 300-watt lamp, which was placed too close to combustible materials, specifically a wooden speaker enclosure." The lamp had been placed for rehearsals of Lex de Azevedo's Gloria: The Life of Christ. The report also found deficiencies with the lack of a fire protection system (including automatic sprinklers and notification system) and human error (including multiple failures to alert authorities of suspicious circumstances such as odor, correcting an unsafe condition, and failure to recognize and respond to the fire alarm).

According to press reports after the fire, a large reproduction painting of Jesus Christ was found to have partially survived. The giclée print of Harry Anderson's The Second Coming, originally contained a number of angels as background figures, all of which were burned. In the center of the print, while Jesus' hands and one arm were fractionally burned, the remainder of the figure was mostly intact and partially surrounded by a largely unburned area. Photographs taken during the fire response show the print was initially unharmed in its place near the east door of the tabernacle, but though the frame remained intact, the print itself somehow became partially charred during Friday night or Saturday as firefighting efforts continued. The print was removed on the afternoon of 18 December and transported to Salt Lake City for conservation.

The fate of a notable original artwork, Minerva Teichert's 1934 painting Restoration of the Melchizedek Priesthood, remained unknown until 22 December. Due to the significance of the painting, the Provo fire marshal permitted fire task force members to enter the east end of the ruined building despite dangerous conditions. In the late afternoon, searchers located the remnants of the painting, which was almost completely destroyed by the fire, and were able to identify it primarily due to the melted Plexiglass of its protective cover. The remnants of the painting were photographed and diagrammed before being turned over to BYU Risk Management officials for transportation to the property owners for preservation. Fire crews stated that, had they been aware of the significance of the painting, they would have made efforts to recover it prior to the collapse of the building's roof. The painting, valued at US$1.5 million, represented 10% of the building's total estimated loss in the fire.

Other major losses included the tabernacle Austin pipe organ (the value of which de Azevedo estimated at over US$1 million), a rented US$100,000 Fazioli grand piano, a US$20,000 Lyon & Healy concert grand harp, and US$2 million in KBYU videography equipment in a single production truck.

== Restoration ==
Provo City Center LDS Temple time-lapse video

LDS Church president Thomas S. Monson announced in general conference on October 1, 2011, that the Provo Tabernacle would be rebuilt to serve as a second temple in Provo, making Provo the second city in the LDS Church to have two temples, following South Jordan, Utah, which has the Jordan River and Oquirrh Mountain temples. It is the second tabernacle in Utah to be converted to a temple, following the Vernal Utah Temple. The restoration included "a complete restoration of the original exterior," and the artist's rendition in the press release included the central tower from the original building. As part of construction, the outer wall was placed on scaffolding for the excavation of two basement levels beneath it.

A public open house was held from Friday, January 15, 2016, through Saturday, March 5, 2016, excluding Sundays, and drew more than 800,000 visitors. The temple was dedicated on Sunday, March 20, 2016.
