= Sophic and mantic =

The sophic and mantic were originally defined by Hugh Nibley in 1963 as a way of describing naturalistic and supernaturalistic ontologies. H. Curtis Wright, a professor in the Brigham Young University (BYU) Library information science program, popularized the distinction, and several Latter-day Saint (LDS) scholars referenced it, mostly in the 1990s. Wright wrote that while mantic approaches include sophic knowledge, sophic approaches exclude mantic knowledge.

Richard Cracroft made the distinction part of his critique of Mormon fiction, in which he proposed fiction could be organized into sophic and mantic categories, with sophic literature aligning with worldly literary standards and mantic literature strengthening the faith of its Mormon readers. Michael Austin and John Bennion criticized this distinction as reductive, with Austin stating that limiting Mormon literary criticism to books by Mormons for a Mormon audience would severely limit its scope.

The sophic/mantic distinction has also been used in Book of Mormon analysis and in an article on folk art in Polish and Mormon contexts.

== Etymology ==
Josephus described an Egyptian king who wanted prophetic gifts as a sophos kai mantikos aner, a sophic and a mantic man. The Greek word mantic means prophetic, inspired, or otherwise not coming from the human mind. According to Lidell and Scott's Greek-English Lexicon, sophic means what humans can learn through their own thinking, while mantic means something that is inspired or divinatory. Sophic is used rather than sophistic, because sophistic came to mean rhetorical.

== Background ==
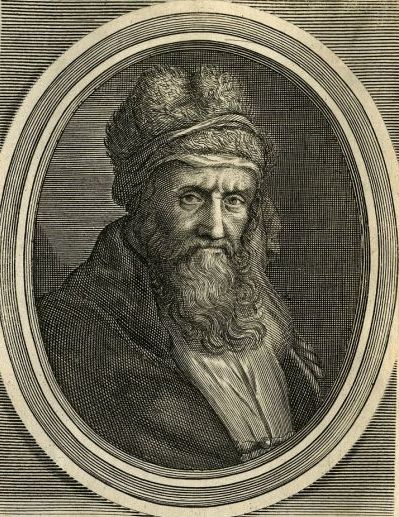
Diogenes Laertius noticed a sophic/mantic divide in classical philosophy between Anazimander and Pythagoras.

Nibley gave a speech entitled "Three Shrines: Mantic, Sophic, and Sophistic" at Yale University in 1963. In this speech, he defined "mantic" as a worldview that believes in the "real and present operation of divine gifts by which one receives constant guidance from the other world"; accepting an "other world" as impossible to truly understand but part of human experience. He defines the sophic as "the tradition which boasted its cool, critical, objective, naturalistic, and scientific attitude". Nibley wrote that "whoever accepts the Sophic attitude must abandon the Mantic, and vice versa." He equated the mantic with Erwin Goodenough's conception of "vertical" Judaism and the sophic with his "horizontal" Judaism. In describing the influence of spiritual inspiration on Nibley's scholarship, Gary Gillum described the sophic/mantic distinction that Nibley proposed in his talk entitled "Three Shrines." Gillum described a sophic attitude as an objective, naturalistic attitude, while a mantic attitude is one which "unhesitatingly accepts supernatural occurrences and feelings as true reality." Gillum wrote that the mantic perspective includes the sophic, but not vice versa. In his notes on the sophic and mantic, Nibley traces the distinction back to Diogenes Laertius's description of philosophy as beginning with Anaximander, a naturalistic philosopher, and Pythagoras, a mathematician interested in the mystical. Empedocles and wrote that true reason was "either divine or human," showing that this distinction was part of classical thought. Nibley found classical and modern examples to support the idea that the sophic often becomes hostile to the mantic, using polemics to refute the mantic. Nibley argued that the mantic was preferable to the sophic, although the mantic had its own flaws. Mantic thinking, in being more flexible, "opens the door to all kinds of quacks and pretenders." On the other hand, mantic thinking does not always have to be "right" like the sophic. Nibley noted that "paradoxically, scientists often pay tribute to intuition, the one thing that strict objectivity will not allow."

H. Curtis Wright, a professor in BYU's Library and Information Sciences program, published multiple articles on the sophic and mantic. He wrote an appendix entitled "The Mantic and Sophic Traditions" in the proceedings of the first Laying the Foundations Symposium. In it, he defined sophic and mantic as naturalism and supernaturalism, respectively. He described the two attitudes as mutually exclusive, with the "metaphysical monism" of the Greeks attracting highly educated secular people and the "metaphysical dualism" of sophism attracting "otherworldly types, including devoutly religious". Wright traced the religious influence on philosophy back to the prelogical idea of physis, which he defined as substance that is alive and divine that gave rise to both atomism, the naturalistic, scientific tradition, and the mystical tradition of Pythagoras and Dionysus.

In a version of his writing on the sophic/mantic distinction for a secular audience, Wright did not use the terms sophic/mantic, but instead used the terms "metaphysical monism" and "metaphysical dualism". Wright characterizes the interaction between naturalism and supernaturalism as one-sided, with naturalism seeking to exterminate supernaturalism, while supernaturalism accepts naturalism. He further wrote that modern scholarship lacks an analysis of this skeptical tradition in intellectual history. Wright described Nibley's sophic-mantic studies as possibly "the most insightful thing he has ever done", describing the idea as "far more basic than the epistemological disjunction of reason and the senses". Wright wrote that he specifically sought out Nibley's "sophic-mantic studies", giving them to Gary Gillum for eventual collection as part of the complete works of Hugh Nibley. "Three Shrines" appears in The Ancient State. Wright authored a book called Gospel and Antigospel: A mantic-to-sophic theory of ancient-to-modern reformations in 2009. In an interview, Wright explained that sophic and mantic "determine the sensory-noetic disjunction implicit in Greek thinking," or how we typically think about sensory information in a scientific way, but about ideas and literary things differently.

== Influence ==
=== In Mormon literary criticism ===
The sophic/mantic distinction had a visible influence on the intellectual thought of BYU professors, who used the terms when communicating to an LDS audience. Mormon literary critic and BYU English professor Richard Cracroft, in a presidential address to the Association of Mormon Letters, used Nibley's mantic/sophic distinction to explain what he perceived as a problem in Mormon letters: writers and critics who sought to both "have their faith and doubt it." He accused Mormon critics of having a "confusion between Mantic and Sophic stances", using Eugene England's praise for Levi S. Peterson's The Backslider as an example of a critic who praised a book that was "faithful to a Sophic and secular vision of literature" but made Cracroft's "Mantic sensibilities recoil". Cracroft praised Mormon writers with "Mantic voices" that "speak to the Saints within the fold", such as Orson Scott Card for his Tales of Alvin Maker series, and Marilyn Brown's The Earthkeepers. The address was reprinted in Sunstone magazine in 1993. Michael Austin wrote that Cracroft's sophic-mantic dichotomization was oversimplifying literature based on whether or not it was "good" for Mormons. He further argued that to limit Mormon literary criticism to books "written by Mormons for Mormons dealing with Mormon themes" would stifle the ability of literary critics to engage with a larger academic community. John Bennion similarly characterized the way that Cracroft separated Mormon works into sophic and mantic categories as another attempt by a literary critic to separate literature into binary categories, with one category being superior. He acknowledged that the genre of the novel is important to judging its quality, emphasizing that popular literature should not be judged the same way as literary fiction. He encouraged nuance, stating that "few examples [of literature] are purely mantic and popular or purely sophic and literary." In an essay on LDS literary criticism, Richard Rust, an LDS professor of English at University of North Carolina at Chapel Hill wrote: "from a Mantic perspective, to understand and evaluate literary creation is to be in touch with divinity." Writing an annotated bibliography of literary Mormon humor in 1998, Sharlene Bartholomew wrote that Mormon literature was difficult to classify in Cracroft's way. She used Levi Peterson's "The Christianizing of Coburn Heights" as an example of fiction positively focused on religious themes, but that would not be classified as "mantic" or devotional literature.

=== Other uses ===
Matthew Hilton and Neil Flingers make sophic and mantic the center of their 1990 essay entitled "The Impact of Shifting Cultural Assumptions on the Military Policies Directing Armed Conflict Reported in the Book of Alma". They define it as a synonym for the vertical/horizontal distinction in Judaism and the supernatural/natural distinction in modern-day. Later they define the vertical position as "driven by revelation from God" and the horizontal as simply its opposite. A reviewer complained that the authors assumed readers would understand the sophic/mantic distinction without explaining it.

In a 2004 ongoing interchange between him and Dan Vogel about the Book of Mormon, independent amateur scholar Kevin Christensen criticized Vogel for equating the supernatural with pseudo-science and pseudo-history. In the section entitled "Science and Religion, Sophic and Mantic," Christensen quotes Nibley's observation that "those whom the Sophic claims for its greatest representatives lean strongly towards the Mantic, though the Sophic proposition condemns any such concessions." In other words, some of the world's greatest scientists and scholars have been highly interested in religion and divine influence. Christensen continues, arguing that there are "subjective" or supernatural aspects to science, but in a lesser degree than they are present in religion.

In discussing Polish folk art in 1997, Doris R. Dant described the artists who pray for inspiration in their art as part of Nibley's "mantic" tradition. He compared the way that Polish folk artists seek inspiration for their art with the way that some LDS artists seek it. He defined the "mantic impulse" as a desire from an artist to use inspiration to achieve their artistic goals.

Michael Hicks, a music theory professor at BYU, wrote two compositions for solo piano entitled "Sophikos" and "Mantikos", which reference the sophic and mantic distinction. Hicks writes that these equate to "rationalized" and "prophetic," as described in his notes in the album Felt Hammers.

== See also ==
- Noetic
- Orphic

== Works cited ==
- Bennion, John (1997). "Popular and Literary Mormon Novels: Can Weyland and Whipple Dance Together in the House of Fiction?". BYU Studies. 37 (1).
- Gillum, Gary (2022). "Hugh Winder Nibley: The Man, The Scholar, The Legacy". In Bradshaw, Jeffrey M.; Ricks, Shirley S.; Whitlock, Stephen T. (eds.). Hugh Nibley Observed. The Interpreter Foundation. ISBN 9781890718930.
- Nibley, Hugh (1991). "Three Shrines: Mantic, Sophic, and Sophistic". In Parry, Donald W.; Ricks, Stephen D. (eds.). The Ancient State: The Rulers and the Ruled. The Collected Works of Hugh Nibley. Vol. 10 Ancient History. Salt Lake City: Deseret Book Company. ISBN 0875793754.
- Nibley, Hugh (1991). "Paths That Stray: Some Notes on Sophic and Mantic". In Parry, Donald W.; Ricks, Stephen D. (eds.). The Ancient State: The Rulers and the Ruled. The Collected Works of Hugh Nibley. Vol. 10 Ancient History. Salt Lake City: Deseret Book Company. ISBN 0875793754.
- Rust, Robert (2001). ""Virtuous, Lovely, or of Good Report": Thoughts on a Latter-day Saint Literary Criticism". In Cracroft, Richard; Brady, Jane D.; Adams, Linda Hunter (eds.). Colloquium: Essays in Literature and Belief. Provo: Center for the Study of Christian Values in Literature; Brigham Young University Press.
- Wright, H. Curtis (1989). "Naturalism and Revealed Religion". Scholar and Educator. 13 (1).
- Wright, H. Curtis (1991). "Appendix:The Mantic and Sophic Traditions". In Flinders, Neil J.; Holladay, Valerie (eds.). Laying the Foundations: A Symposium Initiated by the Moral Character and Agency Education Research Group and Sponsored by the College of Education, Brigham Young University. Provo.
- Wright, H. Curtis (Summer 1991). "A Sophic and a Mantic People". BYU Studies. 31 (3): 51–65. JSTOR 43041518.
