= William H. Folsom =

American architect

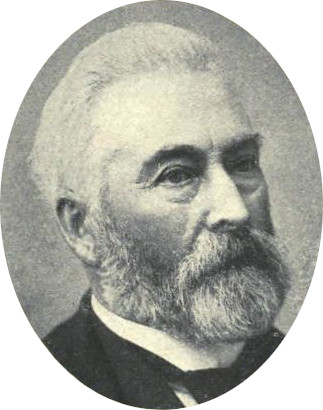
- Born: March 25, 1815; Portsmouth, New Hampshire
- Died: March 19, 1901 (aged 85); Salt Lake City, Utah
- Occupations: Architect, contractor
- Years active: c. 1831 – 1901
- Spouse: Zervial Eliza Clark
- Buildings: Manti Temple, Provo Tabernacle

William Harrison Folsom (March 25, 1815 – March 19, 1901) was an architect and contractor. He constructed many of the historic buildings in Utah, particularly in Salt Lake City. Many of his most prominent works were commissioned by the Church of Jesus Christ of Latter-day Saints (LDS Church). For a time he was sustained as the Church Architect, a calling in the church.

== Personal life ==
Folsom was born in Portsmouth, New Hampshire. By the age of 16 he held a supervisory position in his father's contracting firm. Folsom directed up to hundreds of employees on dock projects around Lake Erie. He and his father then moved to Buffalo, New York, where they ran a building business.

In New York Folsom met his future wife Zervial Eliza Clark, whom he married at age 22 on August 12, 1837. Folsom also encountered Latter Day Saint stonemason Enoch Reese, who helped convert him to Mormonism. Folsom and his wife were baptized members of the Church of Jesus Christ of Latter Day Saints in the frigid Niagara River on February 17, 1842.

== Early career ==
After joining the church, Folsom and his wife traveled to Nauvoo, Illinois, in the spring of 1842. Nauvoo was then headquarters of the church, and Folsom became an acquaintance of Joseph Smith, the church's founder. Folsom worked on the Nauvoo Temple until its completion in May 1846, when Mormons were forced from Nauvoo. He worked on the temple with Truman Angell and Miles Romney, both of whom became lifelong friends.

At this point Folsom moved to Keokuk, Iowa. In 1851 he traveled to the town of Rough and Ready, California, in the foothills of the Sierra Nevada, where he worked on water projects that were needed to mine gold. He then returned to his family in 1852.

Folsom committed to follow Brigham Young to the Salt Lake Valley. In 1854, he set out for Salt Lake City but arrived at Council Bluffs, Iowa, ten days too late to join the last company west. Instead, he stayed at Council Bluffs for six years employed as a builder. Notably, he worked on columns for the Nebraska Territory capitol building, which were transported across the Missouri River from Council Bluffs to Omaha.

In 1860, Folsom finally set out for the Utah Territory with a relatively large outfit of four wagon teams. Soon after his October 3 arrival in Salt Lake City, Folsom opened shop on Main Street downtown. Brigham Young, president of the LDS Church, put him to work on church projects almost immediately. He was sustained as Church Architect in the October 1861 General Conference.

== Architect ==
Folsom worked prolifically in the 1860s. By 1864, he was planner in two construction firms, one with Miles Romney. Folsom himself drew the plans or was involved in the construction of many historic Utah buildings including the Old Salt Lake Theatre, the Salt Lake Tabernacle, the Salt Lake City Council Hall, the Provo Tabernacle, the Provo Theatre, the Moroni Tabernacle, and the original ZCMI building in downtown Salt Lake City. Folsom also had ecclesiastical duties in the LDS Church, serving first as a stake high councilor and then as first counselor in the Salt Lake Stake Presidency in 1874.

In 1867, Truman O. Angell, who had recovered from poor health, was again made church architect and Folsom was made his assistant. In 1877, while serving as an assistant to the church architect, Folsom was called by the LDS Church to design the Manti Temple; Folsom lived in Manti, Utah, until the temple's completion in 1888. Returning to Salt Lake City, he was building inspector under Mayor John Clark until 1890. Folsom served some of his last years as an LDS Church stake patriarch before his death in 1901.

== Images of works ==
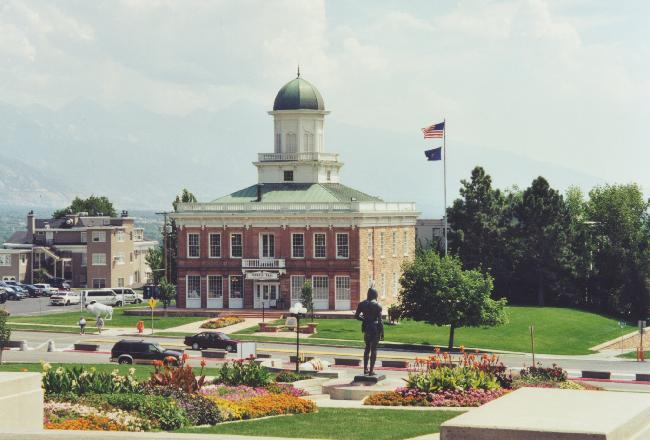
Salt Lake City Council Hall

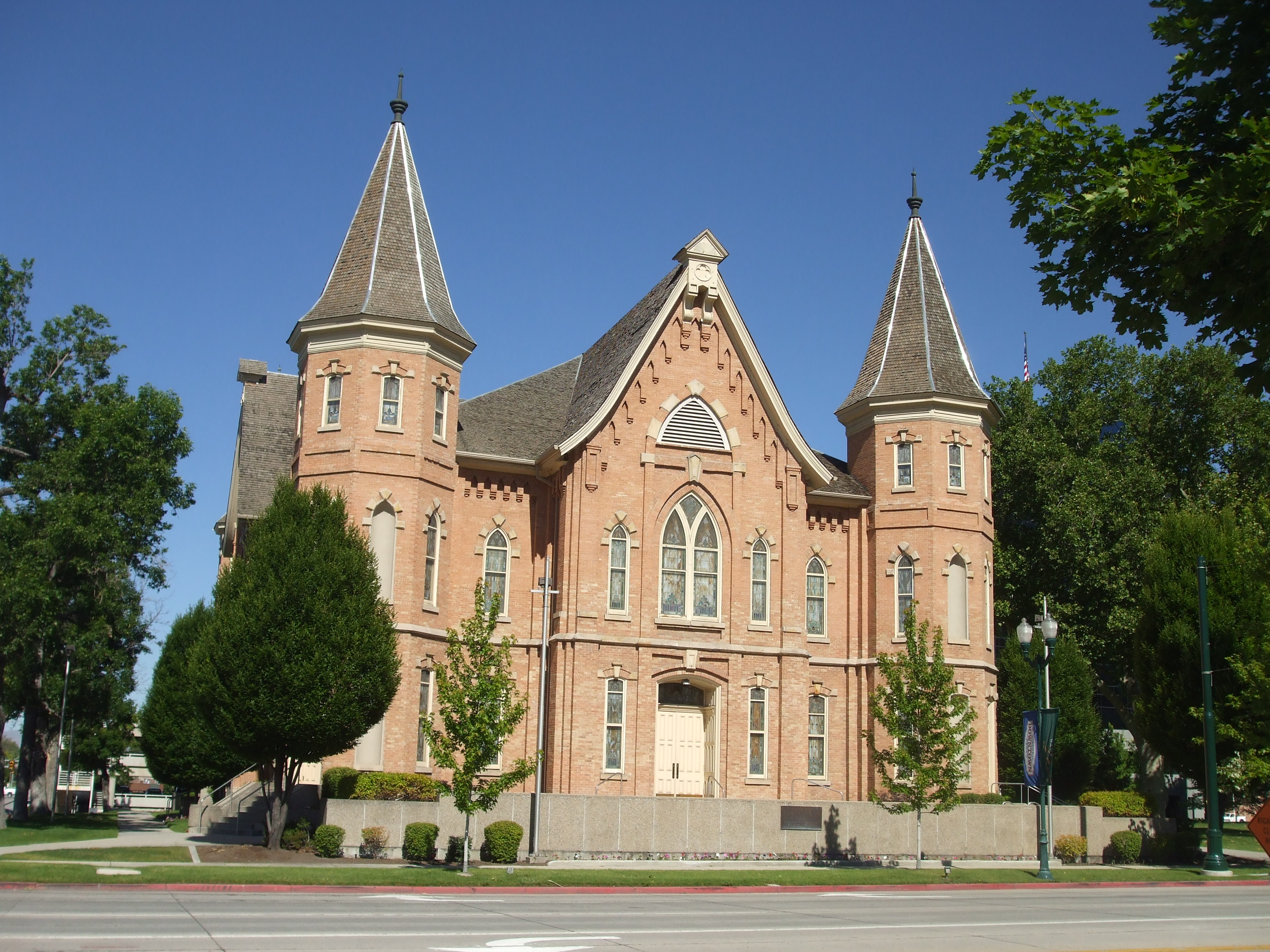
Provo Tabernacle

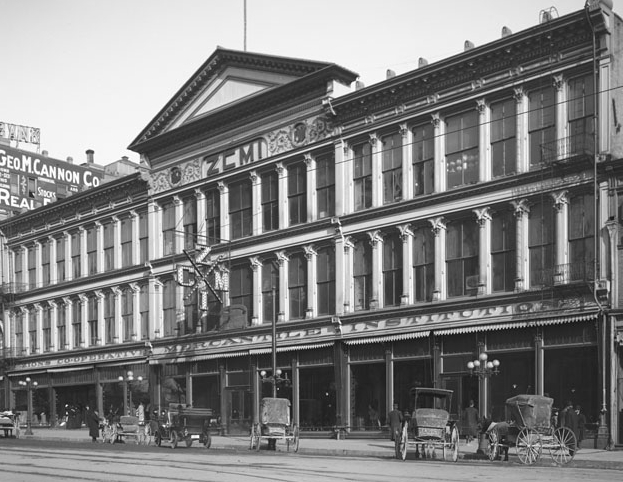
ZCMI & Cast Iron Front

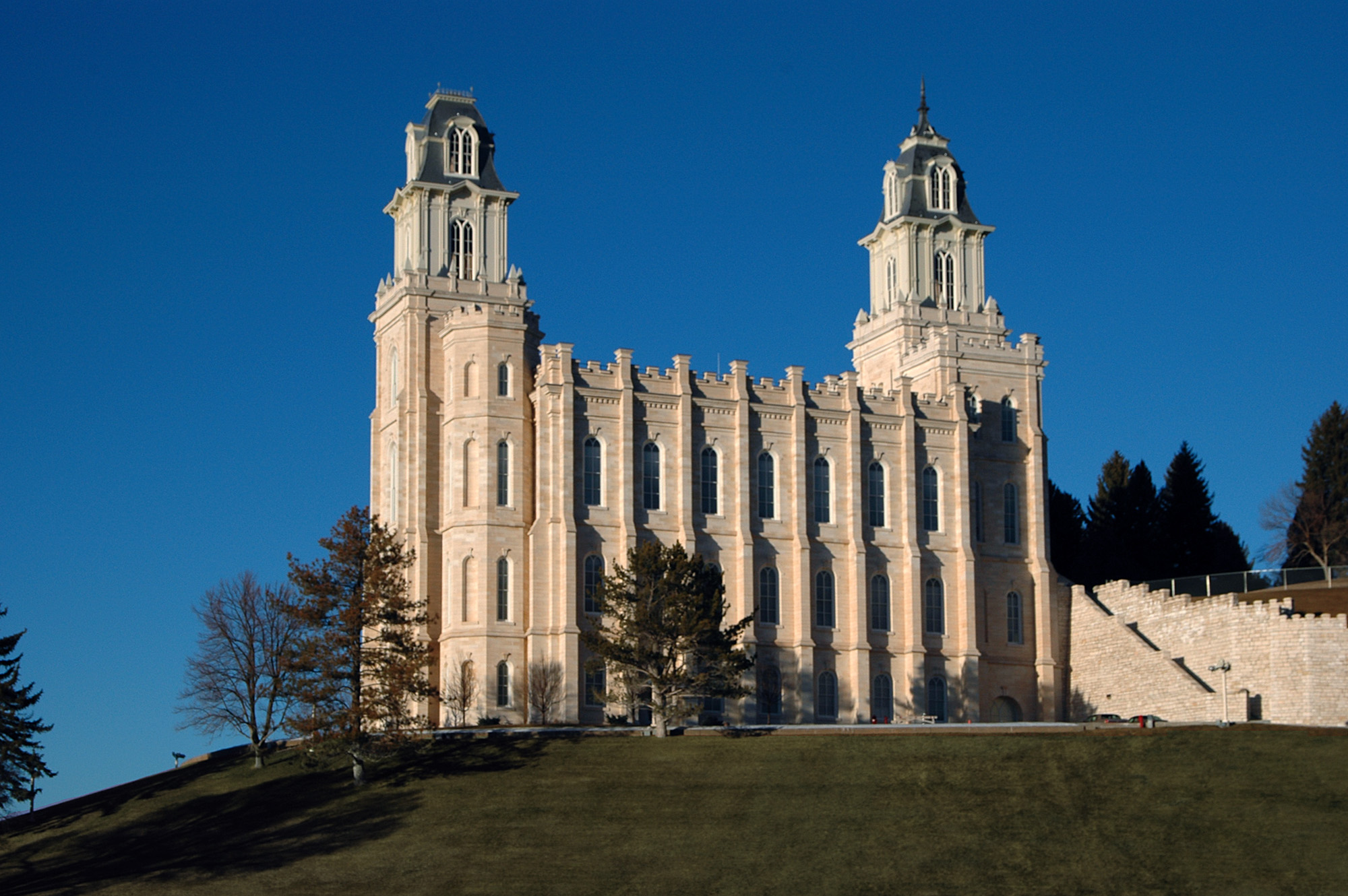
Manti Utah Temple

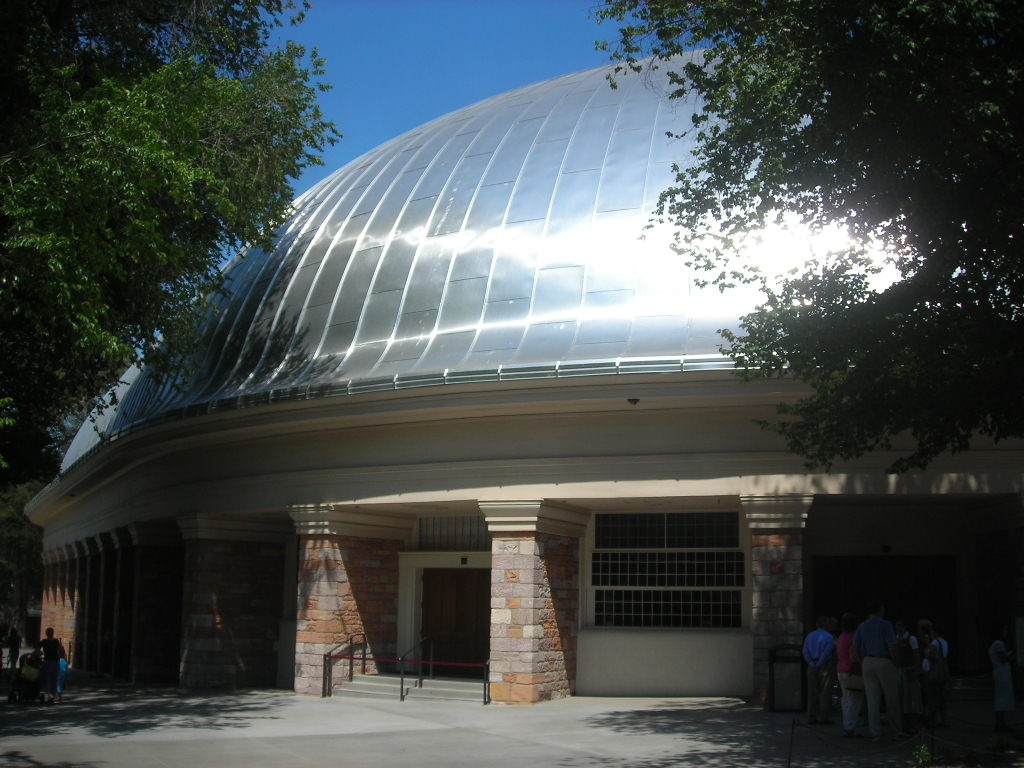
Salt Lake Tabernacle

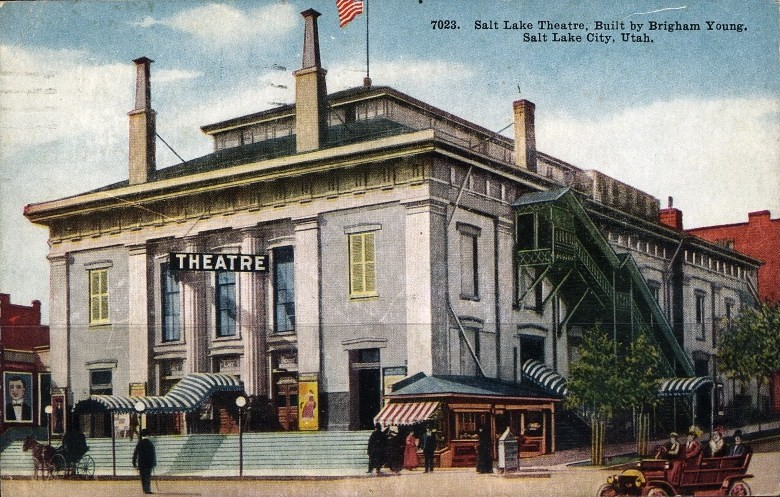
Salt Lake Theatre

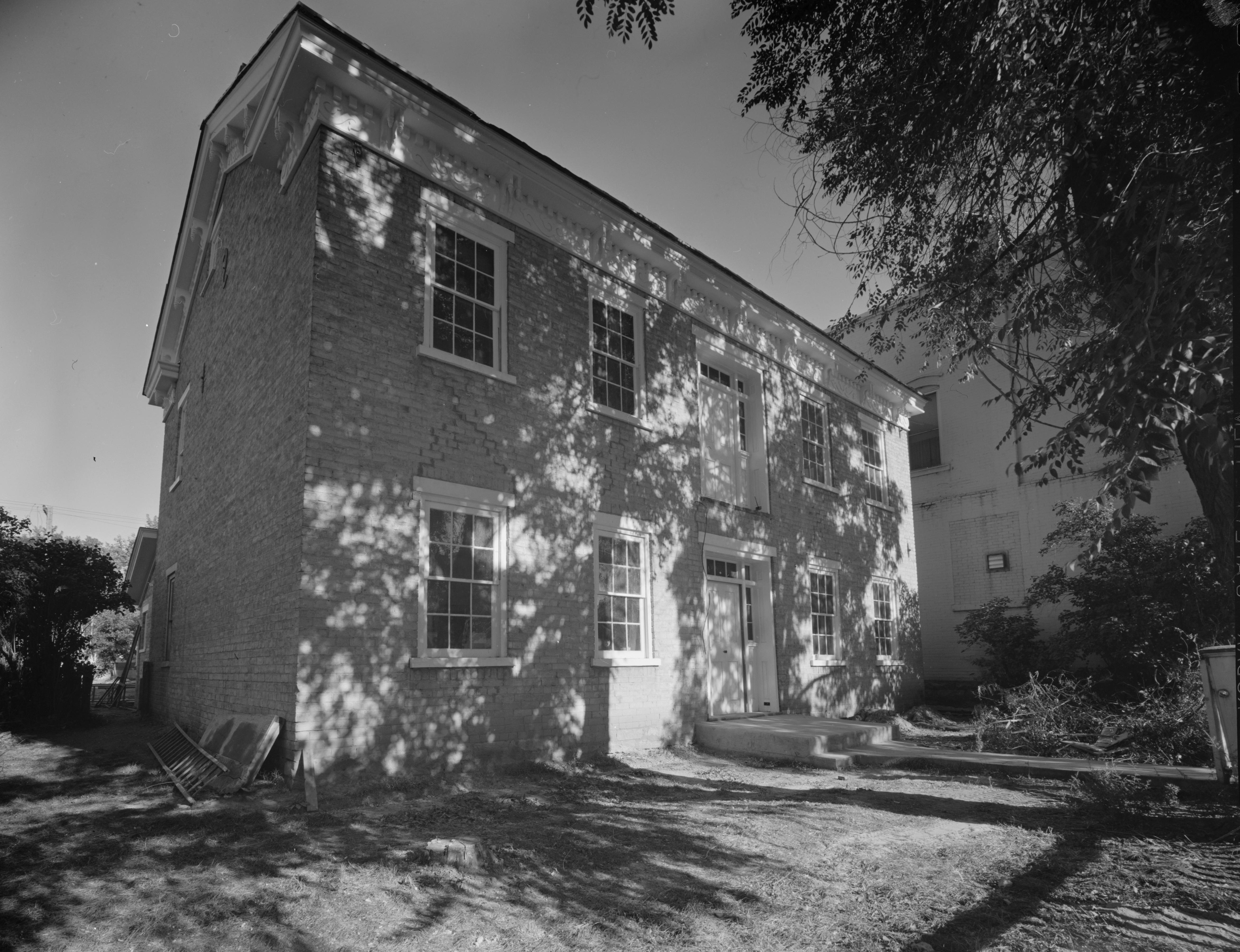
Canute Peterson House

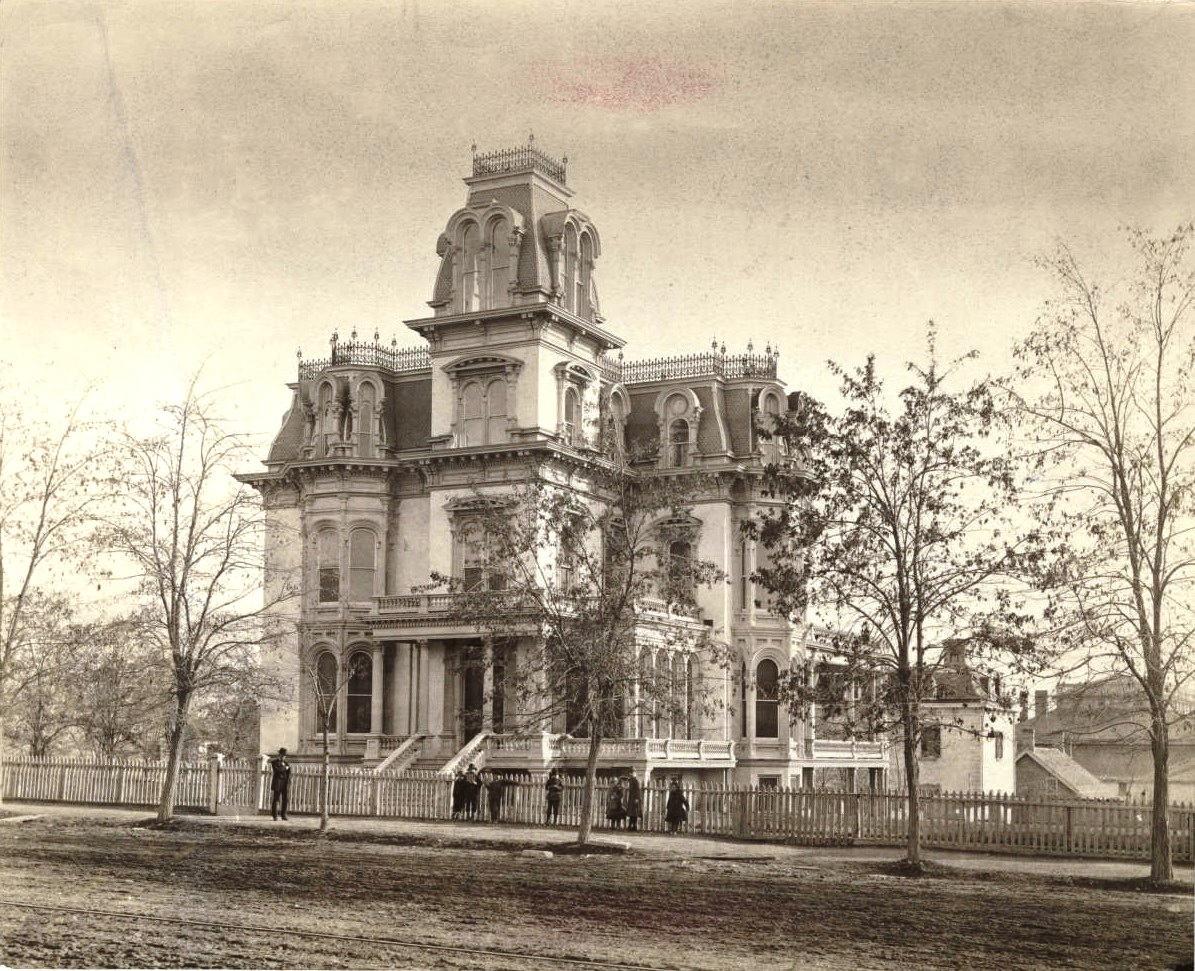
Gardo House, designed with Joseph Ridges

== See also ==
- Temple architecture (LDS Church)
- List of temples (LDS Church)
