= Alexander Neibaur =

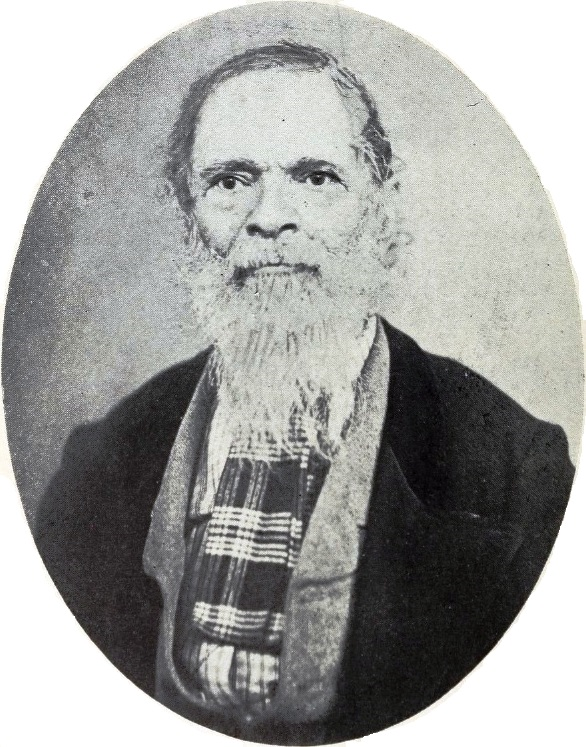

Personal details
- Born: January 8, 1808; Ehrenbreitstein, Duchy of Nassau, France
- Died: December 15, 1883 (aged 75); Salt Lake City, Utah Territory, United States
- Resting place: Salt Lake City Cemetery; 40.777°N 111.858°W
- Spouse(s): Ellen Breakel
- Children: 11
- Parents: Nathan and Rebecca P. Neibaur

Alexander Neibaur (January 8, 1808 – December 15, 1883) was the first dentist to practice in Utah and the first Jew to join the Latter Day Saint movement. He was educated for the profession at the University of Berlin and was a skilled dentist before the establishment of dental schools in America. He was fluent in 7 languages and as many dialects.

== Early life ==
Neibaur was born in 1808 to Nathan and Rebecca Peretz Neibaur in Ehrenbreitstein, near Koblenz. Because that area had been incorporated into France by Napoleon, Neibaur's father served as a surgeon in the Army of France.

Neibaur was first educated to be a rabbi but concluded to become a surgeon and dentist. He received a degree to that end in 1827, before his 20th birthday. Neibaur converted to Christianity approximately two years later. He moved to Preston, England, in 1830. On 15 September 1834, Neibaur married Ellen Breakell, who was from a Church of England family.

In 1837, he converted to the faith of the Church of Jesus Christ of Latter-day Saints after reading the Book of Mormon in three days, but was persuaded to delay his baptism until the following spring that he might be more prepared for the ordinance. He was baptized into the Church of Jesus Christ of Latter Day Saints on 9 April 1838.

== Life and family ==
Neibaur arrived in Nauvoo, Illinois, on 18 April 1841. There he established his dental practice and developed a close friendship with Joseph Smith, Jr., whom he helped study German and Hebrew. His friendship was close enough that he heard an account of the First Vision, which he recorded in his journal.

In 1846, after Smith's death, Neibaur and his wife Ellen remained in Nauvoo later than the first Mormon pioneers because Ellen was pregnant, but joined the second party. Neibaur was among the defenders of the city during the Battle of Nauvoo.

He then went to Winter Quarters, Nebraska, and arrived in the Salt Lake Valley, rejoining with the main body of The Church of Jesus Christ of Latter-day Saints (LDS Church) in 1848. In the Utah Territory, he continued the practice of dentistry and was a manufacturer of matches.

=== Family ===
Neibaur was the primary person to introduce Mormonism to Morris D. Rosenbaum, a Jew who later became his son-in-law. Neibaur's daughter Rebecca married industrialist and LDS Church leader Charles W. Nibley, thus Rosenbaum's brother-in-law, and early business partner. Rosenbaum was instrumental—along with his second father-in-law, President Lorenzo Snow—in the founding and development of Brigham City, Utah, and served as county commissioner and president of the North Germany Mission. Neibaur's eldest daughter, Margaret Jane, married William Miller, the son of Eleazer Miller. Margaret Neibaur Miller's father-in-law, Eleazer, converted and baptized Brigham Young (who would become the second prophet and President of The LDS Church).

Neibaur is a great-grandfather of scholars Hugh, Reid, and Richard Nibley, as well as founder of a large and diverse family to be found throughout the Western United States. His great-great-granddaughter is American sociologist, life coach, and best-selling author Martha Beck.

== Sources ==
- Cornwall, J. Spencer (1975), Stories of Our Mormon Hymns, Salt Lake City: Deseret Book, pp. 246–247
- Ogden, D. Kelly (1995), Porter, Larry C. (ed.), "Two From Judah Minister to Joseph", Regional Studies in LDS History: Illinois, Provo, Utah: Brigham Young University, Religious Studies Center, pp. 232–237
- The diary of Alexander Neibaur.
