= Martha Beck =

American sociologist

- Born: Martha Nibley; November 29, 1962 (age 63); Provo, Utah, U.S.
- Education: Harvard University
- Occupations: Author; life coach; speaker; sociologist
- Spouse: John Beck (m. 1983; div. 2004)
- Children: 3
- Parent: Hugh Nibley
- Writing career
- Notable work: Leaving the Saints
- Website: marthabeck.com

Martha Nibley Beck (born November 29, 1962) is an American author, life coach, speaker, and sociologist.

She holds bachelor's, master's, and PhD degrees from Harvard University. Beck is the daughter of Hugh Nibley, a deceased scholar of the Church of Jesus Christ of Latter-day Saints (LDS Church) and apologist. She received national attention after publication in 2005 of her best-seller, Leaving the Saints: How I Lost the Mormons and Found My Faith in which she recounts her experiences of surviving sexual abuse. In addition to authoring several books, Beck is a columnist for Oprah Daily.

== Early life ==
Martha Nibley was born in Provo, Utah, in 1962, the seventh of eight children of Hugh and Phyllis Nibley, and raised a Latter-day Saint in a prominent Utah family. Her father was a professor at Brigham Young University (BYU). She received a bachelor's degree in East Asian studies, along with master's and PhD degrees in sociology from Harvard University.

== Career ==
During her academic career, Beck worked as a research associate at the Harvard Business School, studying career paths and life-course changes. Before becoming a life coach, she taught sociology, social psychology, organizational behavior, and business management at Harvard and the American Graduate School of International Management. She has published academic books and articles on a variety of social science and business topics. Her non-academic books include New York Times bestsellers Expecting Adam and Leaving the Saints, as well as Finding Your Own North Star: Claiming the Life You Were Meant to Live, Steering by Starlight, and Finding Your Way in a Wild New World: Reclaiming Your True Nature, and The Way of Integrity: Finding the Path to Your True Self.

Beck has also been a contributing editor for popular magazines, including Real Simple and Redbook, and has been a columnist for O, the Oprah Magazine since July 2001. Beck is the founder of Martha Beck, Inc., which offers Wayfinder Life Coach Training, and other courses based on Beck's philosophies.

== Personal life ==
Beck met John Christen Beck, a fellow LDS Church member from Utah, during her undergraduate studies at Harvard. They married in the Salt Lake Temple in Salt Lake City, Utah, on June 21, 1983. They eventually had three children together.

After the birth of their second child, Adam, who had been diagnosed with Down syndrome prior to his birth, Beck returned with her husband and children to Utah to be closer to family and support. Expecting Adam: A True Story of Birth, Rebirth and Everyday Magic is Beck's story about her decision to give birth to and raise Adam.

In 1990, soon after the birth of her third child, Beck, as a part-time faculty member at BYU in Provo, Utah, taught a course on the sociology of gender in the Department of Social Science. During her time as part-time faculty member at BYU, five Mormon scholars were excommunicated from the LDS Church as a consequence of public writings that were deemed critical of the church; the group became known as the September Six. She and husband, John Beck, also made critical public statements about both the excommunications and other church and BYU matters, which led to first John, then Martha herself, leaving the LDS Church in 1993.

Since leaving the LDS Church, both Martha Beck and her now ex-husband subsequently came out publicly as gay. In 2003, Beck separated from her husband, divorcing him in 2004. She now lives with her family in Pennsylvania.

== Leaving the Saints ==
Beck's 2005 book Leaving the Saints: How I Lost the Mormons and Found My Faith was controversial for accusations that she was sexually abused by her father, scholar and LDS Church apologist Hugh Nibley, as well as stating she recovered memories of the abuse. She writes that she had forgotten the abuse until later in her life when, in 1990, she recovered them. The veracity of recovered memories is disputed, and the American Psychological Association says "there is a consensus among memory researchers and clinicians that most people who were sexually abused as children remember all or part of what happened to them," though there is also agreement among most leaders in the field, "that although it is a rare occurrence, a memory of early childhood abuse that has been forgotten can be remembered later." The allegations have been denied by Beck's mother and seven siblings. The book prompted widespread reaction, much of it within the Mormon community, and an email campaign against the book's inclusion on Oprah Winfrey's website as well as in her magazine. In her book she writes "The peculiar details of my memories had at first made me doubt myself -- they were so weird -- but in the end, reinforced my conviction that I hadn't unconsciously made something up."

A New York Times article sums up with "Church members are also angry that Beck jokes about aspects of the Mormon faith; for example, she refers to the religious garments that Mormons wear in their temples as "holy long johns." But the main complaint about "Leaving the Saints" is that Beck has targeted one of the most admired of all the Latter-day Saints. "Books by apostates from the church, they come along all the time," Wotherspoon, of Sunstone Magazine, said. "But an attack on Hugh Nibley -- to call Hugh Nibley a pedophile and a liar, with no evidence to back it up -- of course that is going to hit the Mormon community like an earthquake."

== Works ==
Books

- Beck, Martha Nibley; Beck, John C (1990). Breaking the Cycle of Compulsive Behavior. Salt Lake City: Deseret Book Company. ISBN 978-0-87579-290-3. OCLC 20799870.
- —— (1997). Breaking Point: Why Women Fall Apart and How They Can Re-create Their Lives. New York: Times Books. ISBN 978-0-8129-6375-5.
- —— (1999). Expecting Adam: A True Story of Birth, Rebirth, and Everyday Magic. Times Books. ISBN 978-0812929805.
- —— (2001). Finding Your Own North Star. New York: Crown Publishers. ISBN 978-0-8129-3218-8.
- —— (2003). The Joy Diet: 10 Daily Practices for a Happier Life. Crown Publishers. ISBN 978-0-609-60990-3.
- —— (2005). Leaving the Saints: How I Lost the Mormons and Found My Faith. Crown Publishers. ISBN 9780609609910. OCLC 55494925.
- —— (2007). The Four Day Win: End Your Diet War and Achieve Thinner Peace. Emmaus, Pennsylvania: Rodale Books. ISBN 978-1-59486-607-4.
- —— (2009). Steering by Starlight: The Science and Magic of Finding Your Destiny. Rodale Books. ISBN 978-1-60529-864-1.
- —— (2011). Finding Your Way in a Wild New World: Reclaim Your True Nature to Create the Life You Want. New York: Free Press. ISBN 978-1-4516-2448-9.
- —— (2013). The Martha Beck Collection: Essays on Creating Your Right Life (self-published). Vol. 1. San Luis Obispo, California: Martha Beck, Inc. ISBN 978-0989306706.
- —— (2016). Diana, Herself: An Allegory of Awakening (self-published). San Luis Obispo, California: Cynosure Publishing. ISBN 978-1944264000.
- —— (2021). The Way of Integrity: Finding the Path to Your True Self (The Open Field). Penguin. ISBN 978-1984881489.
- —— (2024). Beyond Anxiety: Curiosity, Creativity and Finding Your Life's Purpose. Piatkus. ISBN 978-0349441719.

Thesis

- Beck, Martha Nibley (1994). Flight from the iron cage: LDS women's responses to the paradox of modernization (PhD). Harvard University. OCLC 32034090.
