= Canute Peterson =

Mormon pioneer

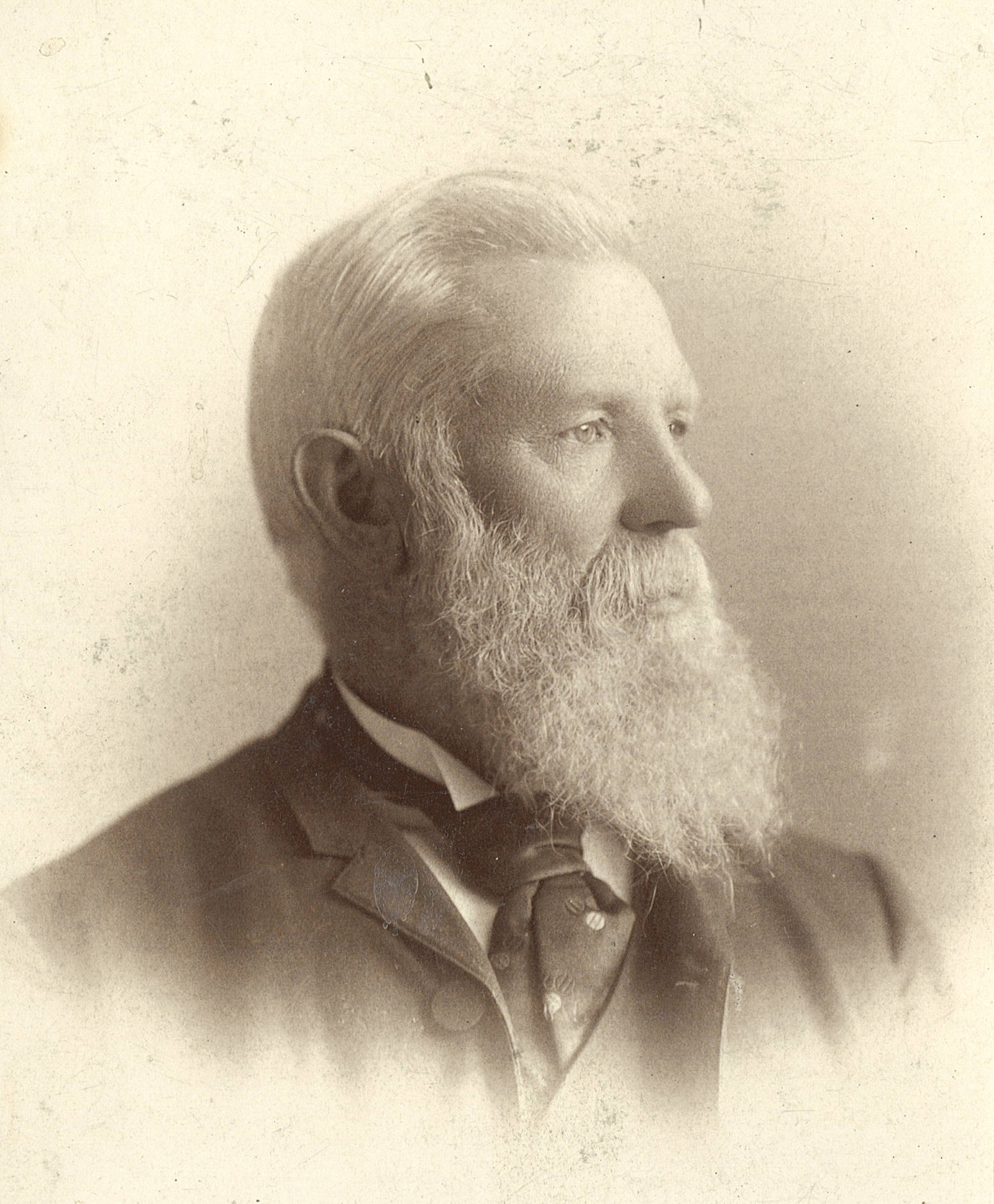
Canute Peterson, c. 1880

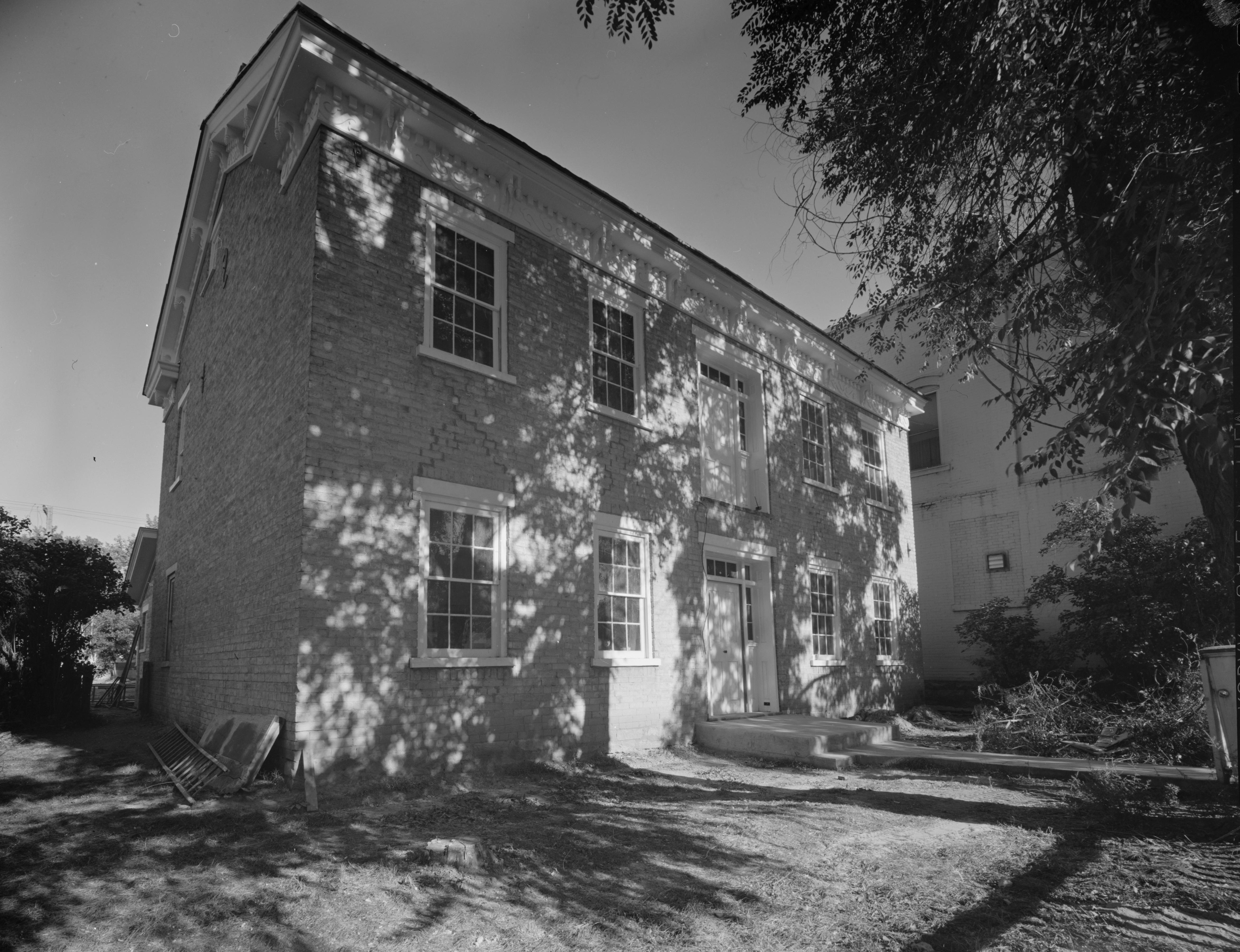
Peterson's house in Ephraim

Canute Peterson (also Knud Peterson; May 13, 1824 – October 14, 1902) was a Mormon pioneer settler of Utah Territory and was a leader in LDS Church.

== Biography ==
Peterson was born in Bergen, Norway. In Norway, he became a member of the Religious Society of Friends and emigrated to the United States in 1837. In 1842, while living in LaSalle County, Illinois, he became a member of the LDS Church. After joining the church, he became a missionary to Norwegians living in Wisconsin.

Peterson led a company of Mormon pioneers to the Salt Lake Valley in 1849. He was one of the founders of Lehi in Utah Territory.

From 1853 to 1855, Peterson was a missionary in the Scandinavian Mission, where he preached in Norway and became the president of the Christiana Conference of the church.

In 1867, Peterson was asked to move to Ephraim, Utah to be a bishop of the church there. Peterson was instrumental in assisting the Latter-day Saints make peace with the Native Americans in Sanpete County.

On October 14, 1882, Peterson became a member of the Council of Fifty.

He died from rheumatic fever at his home in Ephraim on October 14, 1902.

When he died, Peterson was serving as the president of the Sanpete Stake, a position he held since 1877. He was also ordained to the office of patriarch.
