= Hugh Nibley =

Latter-day Saint religious scholar (1910–2005)

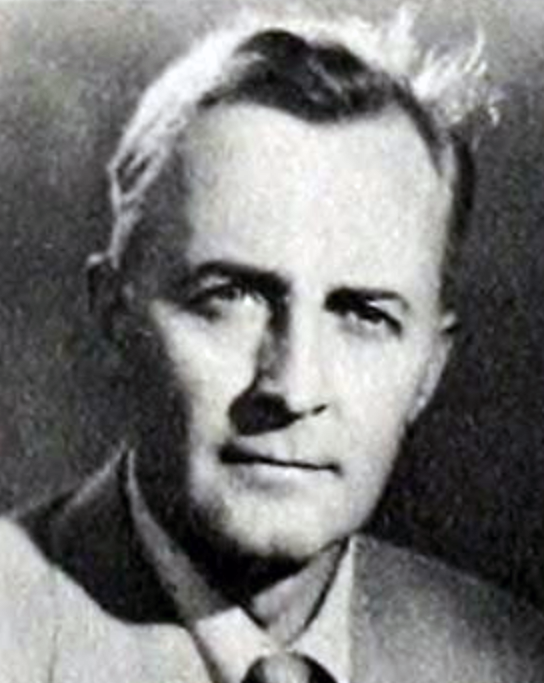
- Nibley's faculty photo from 1953
- Born: Hugh Winder Nibley; March 27, 1910; Portland, Oregon, U.S.
- Died: February 24, 2005 (aged 94); Provo, Utah, U.S.
- Education: University of California, Los Angeles (BA); University of California, Berkeley (PhD)
- Occupations: Scholar; historian; author; professor
- Employer: Brigham Young University
- Political party: Democratic
- Spouse: Phyllis Nibley
- Children: 8, including Martha Beck

Hugh Winder Nibley (March 27, 1910 – February 24, 2005) was an American scholar and member of the Church of Jesus Christ of Latter-day Saints (LDS Church) who was a professor at Brigham Young University (BYU) for nearly 50 years. He was a prolific author, and wrote apologetic works supporting the archaeological, linguistic, and historical claims of Joseph Smith. He was a member of the LDS Church, and wrote and lectured on LDS scripture and doctrinal topics, publishing many articles in the LDS Church magazines.

Nibley was born in Portland, Oregon, and his family moved to Los Angeles, California, in 1921, where Nibley attended middle school and high school. Nibley served an LDS mission in Germany, where he learned German. After his mission, he attended the University of California, Los Angeles (UCLA), where he graduated in 1934. He received his PhD from the University of California, Berkeley (UC Berkeley) in 1938. He taught various subjects at Claremont Colleges until he enlisted in the United States Army in 1942, where he was trained as an intelligence officer as one of the Ritchie Boys.

Nibley became a professor at Brigham Young University (BYU) in 1946, where he taught foreign languages and Christian church history. He continued to study Egyptian and Coptic, and became the figurehead of the Institute for Ancient Studies at BYU in 1973. During his professorship, Nibley wrote articles for scholarly publications and for official LDS Church publications. Nibley published multiple series of articles in the Improvement Era as well as An Approach to the Book of Mormon, which was the lesson manual for Melchizedek priesthood lessons in 1957. Nibley also published a response to the Joseph Smith Papyri as well as other articles on the Pearl of Great Price. In addition to Nibley's church publications, he also published social commentary, often aimed at LDS culture. Nibley's work is controversial. Kent P. Jackson and Douglas F. Salmon have argued that the parallels Nibley finds between ancient culture and LDS works are selective or imprecise. Nibley's defenders like Louis C. Midgley and Shirley S. Ricks argue that his parallels are meaningful.

Hugh Nibley's son, Alex, organized a documentary on Hugh entitled Faith of an Observer. Hugh Nibley's complete works were published jointly by the Foundation for Ancient Research and Mormon Studies (FARMS) and Deseret Book. Around the time of Nibley's death in 2005, his daughter Martha Beck published a memoir where she said she had recovered repressed memories of Nibley sexually abusing her. Immediate family members and some book reviewers of Beck's memoirs considered her claims to be false.

== Early life and education ==
Hugh Nibley was born in Portland, Oregon, son of Alexander ("El") Nibley and Agnes Sloan. Among their other sons were Sloan Nibley, Richard Nibley, and Reid N. Nibley. Their father, Alexander, was the son of Charles W. Nibley, Presiding Bishop of the church. Alexander's mother, wife of Charles, was Rebecca Neibaur. Rebecca was the daughter of Alexander Neibaur, one of the first Jewish people to convert to Mormonism. Alexander Nibley served as mission president of the Liège Conference.

In 1917, Nibley's family moved to Medford, Oregon, where his father started to manage his father's sugar beet company. The next year at age eight, Nibley was baptized into the LDS Church. The family returned to Portland after the sugar beet factory failed in 1919. In 1920, the principal at Nibley's elementary school gave all of his students an IQ test. After seeing Nibley's high scores, the principal decided to privately tutor Nibley. Nibley's parents employed a music tutor and a French tutor for their children as well.

Nibley's family moved to Los Angeles in 1921, where Nibley's father participated in the burgeoning real-estate market and was part of Los Angeles's high society. Nibley attended Alta Loma Middle School from 1921 until 1923. He graduated from Los Angeles High School in 1927, where he was friends with John Cage. Nibley was particularly interested in astronomy, art, and English. In order to see through his telescope unimpeded, he cut off his eyelashes. His interest in literature led him to study Old and Middle English, German, Latin, and Greek. He spent the summer of 1925 working in a lumber mill. In 1926, Nibley's poems appeared in the Improvement Era and The Lyric West. That same year, his family moved to a mansion. Nibley spent six weeks alone in the wilderness near Crater Lake, excited to experience solitude and to "get back to nature" like the transcendentalists. Nibley took part and excelled in the Reserve Officers' Training Corps (ROTC). According to Nibley, he participated in ROTC at his mother's urging, and she hoped that if there was another world war he would be an officer. The summer he was 17, he attended Brigham Young Academy's Aspen Grove summer school.

Nibley's parents were worried about his social development and felt that an LDS mission would help him have more contact with people. In November 1927, Nibley received his temple endowment, and studied at the Salt Lake Mission Home to serve an LDS mission in Germany until 1929. He spent his first three weeks in Germany learning German in Cologne with other missionaries. After his mission, he received special permission to visit Greece for six weeks to contact other members of the LDS Church there.

After his mission, Nibley majored in history at UCLA. He also studied Latin, Greek, and Spanish and graduated summa cum laude in 1934. Nibley's grandfather, Charles, and his brother, Philip, died in 1931 and 1932, respectively. In June 1933, Nibley used his knowledge of shorthand and typing when he served a short-term mission in the northwestern states as the mission stenographer. He returned in time to start his PhD at UC Berkeley in September 1934. In the 1936–1937 school year, he received a fellowship that would have covered his tuition and housing. Nibley's father asked him to loan the money to him and did not repay it. He found a job translating Latin, but because his funds were severely limited, he moved from the expensive International House to a cheap apartment, where his neighbors spoke Arabic. His dissertation, "The Roman Games as a Survival of an Archaic Year Cult", was accepted, and he graduated in 1938.

== Teaching at Claremont and military service ==
Nibley volunteered to teach at Claremont Colleges, and he taught without pay for the 1939–1940 school year, living frugally. The next year he worked as an instructor, and taught history, social philosophy, modern European history, humanities, U.S. history, history of education, Greek, and German. He taught alongside scholars fleeing from Germany, including Thomas Mann, and once co-taught a class with retired professor Everett Dean Martin. He acted as a secretary when prominent intellectuals spoke at the Committee on War Objectives and Peace Aims. He studied more languages, including Irish, Akkadian, Russian, Italian, and Spanish. He sought out native speakers to converse with when possible. In a letter to his friend from UC Berkeley, Paul Springer, Nibley wrote that two of his friends at Scripps College were discovered to be Nazi agents. He resigned from Claremont in June 1942, and then enlisted as a private in the United States Army for World War II.

In the army, Nibley completed weather observation school in March 1943 after he finished basic training. His commanding officer recommended him for officer training, and he attended military intelligence training in the United States Army Intelligence Center at Camp Ritchie in western Maryland. He completed intelligence training on June 2. In August he started attending the second Order of Battle course. Before leaving for Europe, he courted and proposed marriage to Anahid Iskian, but she refused. Nibley became a Master Sergeant along with his fellow Order of Battle graduates. After an OB training in Hyde Park Corner, he was assigned to help compile information on German officers for the June 1944 Order of Battle Book. He instructed officers and other men in the 101st Airborne Division about the German Order of Battle. He was part of the Utah Beach division during the D-Day invasion, and landed by glider at Eindhoven as part of Operation Market Garden. Nibley gathered intelligence on German war movements from civilians, documents, and POWs. He was the only survivor of OB team #5. He visited Dachau concentration camp a few days after its liberation. After being discharged from the army in November 1945, he went camping near Hurricane, Utah.

Improvement Era hired Nibley as a managing editor in 1946. On his own time, Nibley wrote a detailed response to Fawn M. Brodie's significant biography of Joseph Smith, No Man Knows My History. The response, entitled No, Ma'am, That's Not History, identified flaws in Brodie's work, including the way she read the sources, but it did so using "dismissive and patronizing language". According to Ronald Helfrich, author of Mormon Studies: A Critical History, No, Ma'am was "a turning point in the history of Mormon apologetics and polemics" because it used academic language in its arguments. Nibley's patronizing language, Helfrich posited, could be a reflection of Nibley's own "patriarchalism and paternalism". Dale Morgan, a historian who helped Brodie while she wrote the biography, found Nibley "intoxicated with his own language". Richard Bushman, famed for his own biography of Joseph Smith, after hearing the criticisms of No, Ma'am, was surprised by how "on the mark" it was. Nibley's rhetorical style became popular with defenders of the church, and in 1979, Foundation for Ancient Research and Mormon Studies (FARMS) was founded and published "Nibley-style apologetics and polemics".

While living in Salt Lake City, Nibley improved his Russian by insisting that he and his Ukrainian roommate only speak Russian. Nibley promised to pay his roommate one cent for every mistake he made in Russian and two cents for every English word he spoke.

== Professor at BYU ==
Apostle John A. Widtsoe recommended Nibley to BYU President Howard S. McDonald, and he became a professor of religion and history at BYU in 1946. He taught courses in Greek and Russian alongside Christian church history his first year. He arranged for the purchase of over five hundred volumes on the early Christian church for the BYU Library; these volumes now make up the library's Ancient Studies Reading Room. He also acquired volumes in Old Norse from the Icelandic community in Spanish Fork. He was promoted to full professor in 1953. In 1954, Nibley was on the advisory board for a student club focused on "the integration of sundry areas of scientific and spiritual truth" called "Alpha and Omega". Nibley considered leaving BYU to work at the University of Utah, but J. Reuben Clark proposed projects that Nibley could only work on at BYU. Wilkinson agreed that the university would finance two trips to university libraries per year for Nibley, so Nibley stayed at BYU. However, the university did not finance two library trips a year. Nibley published in Western Political Quarterly, Western Speech, and Jewish Quarterly Review in the 1950s.

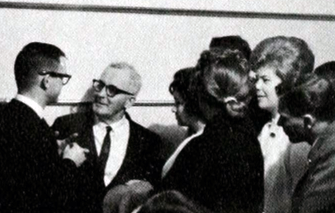
Hugh Nibley visits with BYU students in 1963

For the 1959–1960 school year, Nibley taught at UC Berkeley as a visiting professor in humanities. He studied Egyptian with Klaus Baer, a new faculty member. Nibley was the only student in the Coptic class after several weeks, and one of two students in the Egyptian class. UC Berkeley offered to employ him as a full professor at a higher salary than what he made at BYU. Nibley decided to stay at BYU, and requested to stop teaching language classes. Nibley published a two-part article in Jewish Quarterly Review in October 1959 and January 1960 called "Christian Envy of the Temple", which discussed how early Christians desired temple rites. When Nibley returned to BYU, religion faculty were debating on whether a class on the Book of Mormon or on fundamental LDS Church doctrines should be the required religion class. The debate disillusioned Nibley, and when asked to give a prayer at the June 1960 graduation exercise, he started it by saying, "We have met here today clothed in the black robes of a false priesthood." He published "The Passing of the Church: Forty Variations on an Unpopular Theme" in Church History in 1961. In the article, Nibley argued that early Church Fathers did not expect the Christian church to succeed, and hence did not concern themselves with social issues, church administration, missionary work, or gaining support from the public; instead they hoped for death and their rewards in the afterlife. Hans J. Hillerbrand published a response in the same journal, stating that characterizing the early Christians as having an institutional "church" was "theologically dangerous". Robert M. Grant argued that Nibley had taken statements from church fathers out of context. Grant agreed that the issue of the history of the institutional church was important, since otherwise church history might be reduced to a history of ideas. Nibley did not respond to the comments. Nibley also published articles in Revue de Qumran, Vigiliae Christianae, and Concilium: An International Review of Theology in 1965, 1966, and 1967, respectively. In his article in Vigiliae Christianae, he proposed the idea that Jesus taught his disciples additional rites after his resurrection, drawing on early Christian sources on Gnosticism. For his 1966–1967 sabbatical, he studied Egyptian at the University of Chicago with Klaus Baer and John A. Wilson. He was offered a position to teach at the Clarion State College, but refused.

In 1973, BYU president Dallin H. Oaks convinced Nibley to be the director of the Institute for Ancient Studies at BYU, with an assistant director to take care of the administrative aspects. Retiring from a staff position in 1975, he continued working as a professor emeritus until 1994. He maintained a small office in the Harold B. Lee Library, working on his magnum opus, titled One Eternal Round, focusing on the hypocephalus ("Facsimile 2") in the Book of Abraham.

=== Students ===
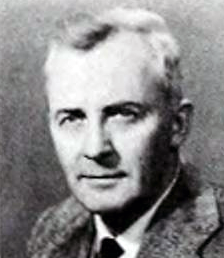
Hugh Nibley's BYU faculty photo from 1957

Notable students of Nibley include Krešimir Ćosić, Avraham Gileadi, John Gee, and Benjamin Urrutia. After befriending Nibley's daughter Christina, Krešimir Ćosić came to Hugh Nibley with questions about the LDS Church. Nibley taught and eventually baptized Ćosić, continuing their gospel discussions until Ćosić graduated in 1973.

=== Social and political viewpoints ===
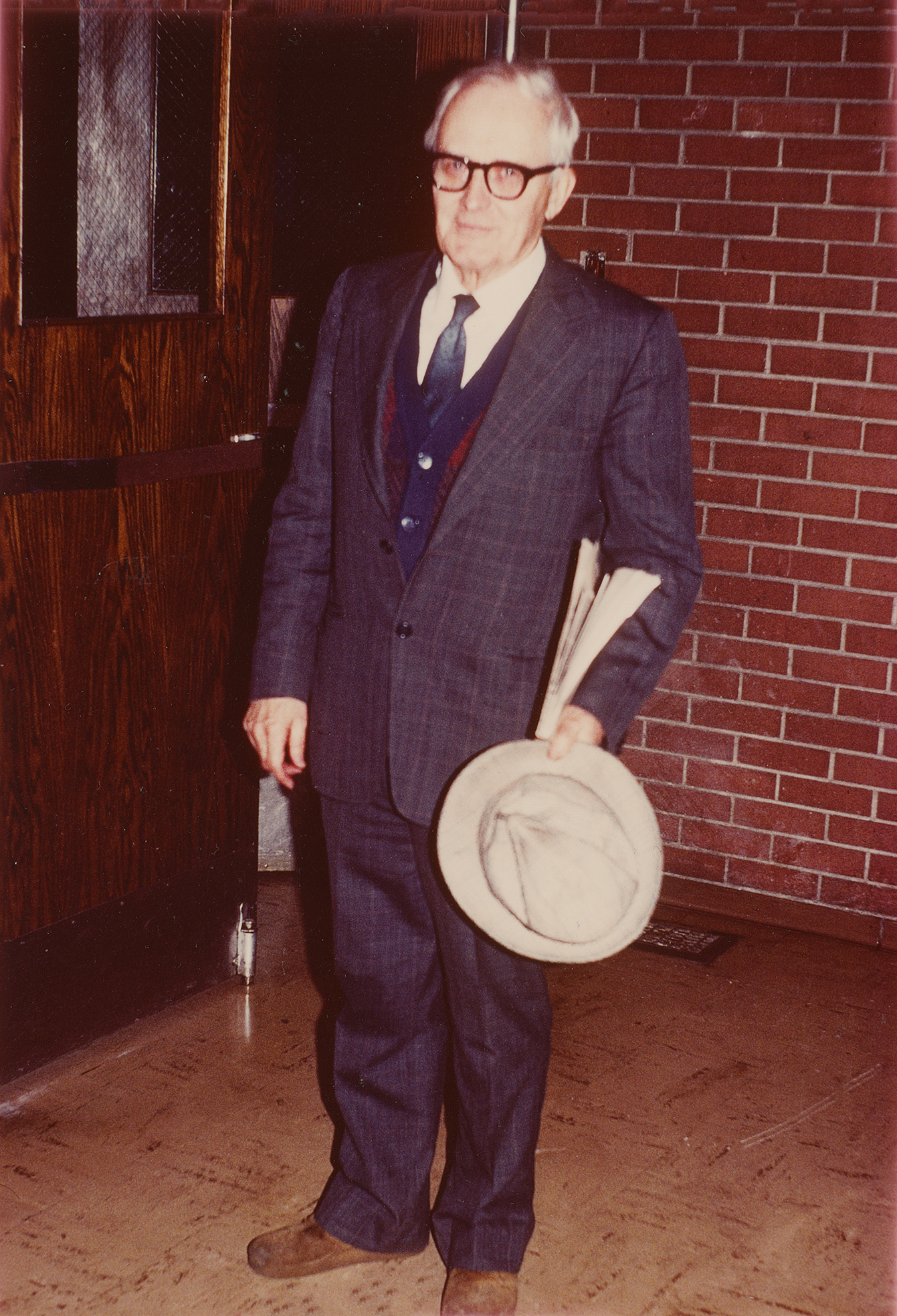
Nibley holding his hat, probably in the late 1970s

Nibley was an active Democrat and a conservationist, pacifist, and anti-materialist. He was strongly opposed to the United States' involvement in the Vietnam War. Approaching Zion, volume 9 of his collected works, contains his essays on culture, where he critiqued capitalism and socialism, and endorsed the law of consecration. In a 1973 speech entitled "What Is Zion? A Distant View", Nibley mentioned the sometimes dogmatic application of the BYU's honor code, particularly the hairstyle and dress standards. Nibley further criticized LDS culture in his 1983 speech "Leaders to Managers: The Fatal Shift" for encouraging students to please their superiors and "not make waves", which Nibley argued was a sign of a decline in culture. In a later interview, Nibley stated that Rex E. Lee and faculty in the school of management hated the speech. Nibley felt that students were more concerned about their appearance than their studies. In his 1975 speech, "Zeal Without Knowledge", he worried that students were overly focused on suffering through church meetings than being genuinely spiritually exercised.

In contrast to the coats and ties he wore at dinners as a teenager in a wealthy home, Nibley himself cultivated an appearance of not caring about his appearance. Two of his colleagues related stories of Nibley contributing to a church collection to buy a new overcoat for someone, not realizing that the person was him. One BYU professor said that Nibley was proud of his unkempt look, joking that they would never make him department chairman at BYU. His house's lawn was often in disarray, which inspired stories about Nibley forbidding his neighbors to clean it up as a service project, or staking a goat to act as a lawn mower.

== Collaborations with the LDS Church ==
In 1957, Nibley's book An Approach to the Book of Mormon was the LDS Church's official lesson manual for Melchizedek priesthood lessons. The book drew parallels between events in the Book of Mormon and ancient Near Eastern traditions. In an essay on Mormon historiography, Marvin S. Hill argued that many of the parallels between ancient culture and the Book of Mormon "seem as much American as they do ancient" though Hill does not go into further detail. That year, Nibley received many letters with questions about religion from members who read his book. He compiled reports on various topics to answer frequently asked questions from readers and to inform general authorities. After the manual was published, he frequently gave speeches to local church congregations. In reviewing the third edition, published in 1988, William J. Hamblin stated that while Nibley's explanation of ancient Near Eastern culture was accurate, he drew anachronistic parallels that weakened his other, stronger arguments. Hamblin also stated that Nibley ignored significant differences between Near Eastern cultures and occurrences in the Book of Mormon.

Nibley published several series in the Improvement Era about the Book of Mormon for a general LDS audience. In 1954, Nibley discussed the circumstances around the early Christian apostasy in a series of thirty talks on a weekly devotional on KSL in 1954. He wrote a series for the Improvement Era on the same topic in 1955, and other series on the Jaredites and Book of Mormon criticism in the late 1950s. Nibley continued to write about evidences of the Book of Mormon's ancient origins in a series of articles published in the Improvement Era between 1964 and 1967. This series was collected in Since Cumorah: The Book of Mormon in the Modern World (1967). The book received some critical attention. In BYU Studies, Alexander T. Stecker found Since Cumorah a "stimulating" introduction to "many problems", but one that overburdened its readers with "irrelevant facts" and lacked a bibliography. In Dialogue, Louis C. Midgley praised Nibley's application of Book of Mormon concepts to current politics. Robert Mesle, a member of the Community of Christ, wrote in a review of the book that Nibley's lack of criticism towards the LDS Church prevented Nibley from being sufficiently critical, describing Nibley's work as "trite and naïve".

In 1961, Nibley published The Myth Makers through Bookcraft. In the book, Nibley countered anti-Mormon assertions about Joseph Smith in the style of a classical apologist. Once again, general authorities were impressed with Nibley's writings, and when Irving Wallace's The Twenty-Seventh Wife was published, they asked Nibley to write a response. Nibley enthusiastically studied historical material about Brigham Young. He published Sounding Brass: Informal Studies in the Lucrative Art of Telling Stories about Brigham Young and the Mormons, which addressed not only the claims in Wallace's book but many other claims about Brigham Young. The book includes the satirical chapter "How to Write an Anti-Mormon Book (A Handbook for Beginners)". In an essay in Historians and the Far West, Thomas G. Alexander stated that Sounding Brass sarcastically points out obvious flaws in a form of "intellectual overkill". Alexander stated that orthodox Mormons would appreciate that the book bolsters their point of view, but that historians would prefer a more detailed treatment of events.

In 1967, the LDS Church acquired the Joseph Smith Papyri. The First Presidency asked Nibley to respond to the papyri. In 1975, Nibley published a translation and commentary of the papyri. In it, Nibley argued that the text of the papyri from the Book of Breathings was connected to the LDS temple ceremony, the Endowment. Nibley continued to write about Abraham, publishing Abraham in Egypt in 1981. He focused on showing that Joseph Smith's writings in the Pearl of Great Price were inspired and derived from ancient texts. Marvin S. Hill criticized Nibley for comparing the Book of Abraham to records from hundreds of years after Abraham; Louis Midgley criticized Hill for misunderstanding Nibley's argument, which was to compare the Book of Abraham against existent parallel literature that was unknown to Joseph Smith. In a 1982 review published in Dialogue, Eric Jay Olsen stated that Nibley's eclectic approach in Abraham in Egypt was overwhelming in its citations of obscure sources. Olsen criticized Nibley's selection of examples that supported his arguments.

In 1985, church leaders were contemplating changes to the temple endowment and asked Nibley to write on the "history and significance of the endowment" for them. In 1986, Nibley presented one essay on the temple to the First Presidency and Quorum of the Twelve Apostles, with another, longer essay on the history of the endowment given for support material. The essays were reprinted in other books, but without specific references to the temple endowment ceremony.

== Scholarship and criticism ==
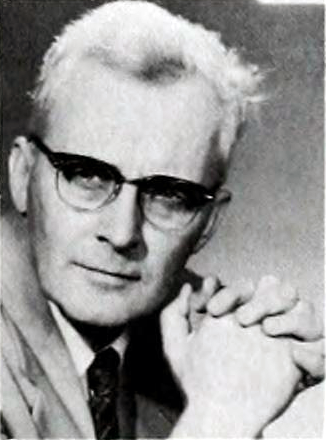
Nibley's faculty photo in 1959.

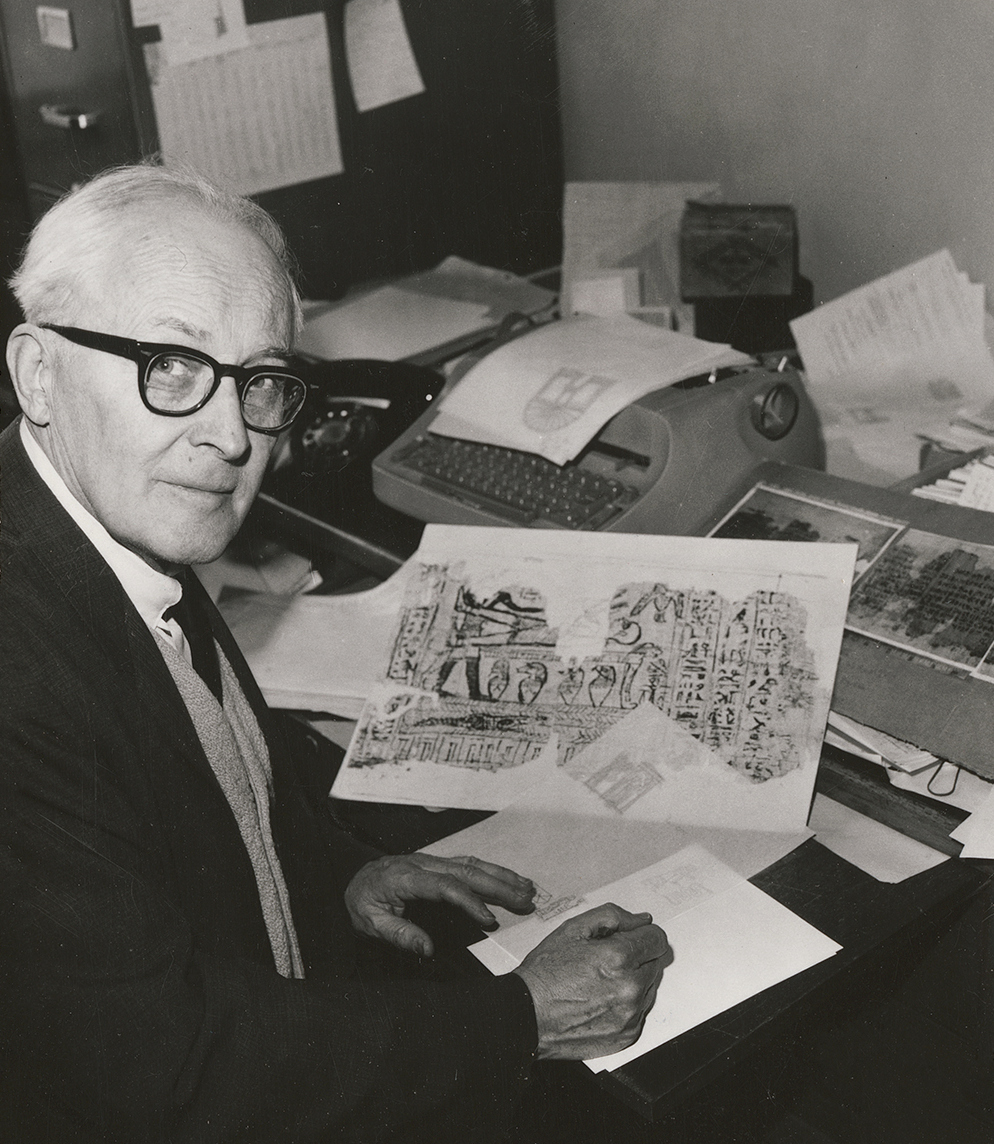
Nibley posing with a copy of Facsimile #1 from the Joseph Smith Papyri, probably in the late 1970s

Evangelical scholars Mosser and Owen called Nibley the "Father of Mormon Scholarly Apologetics". William J. Hamblin, a colleague at BYU, said, "Nibley's methodology consists more of comparative literature than history." Writing for Journal of Book of Mormon Studies, Joseph Spencer, a BYU professor of religion, wrote that Nibley was "the mobilizing force of what now seems to be a field [of Book of Mormon studies]". Nibley himself, in a 1951 letter to Francis Kirkham, wrote that he was not "a Book of Mormon scholar" and defined his studies as "popular works" that "should not come within the scope of a university press". In his defense of the Book of Mormon in Lehi in the Desert and the World of the Jaredites, Nibley positioned himself as composing a defensive case in an intellectual battle against anti-Mormon arguments, acknowledging that as a "counsel for the defense", he was "partial" though he maintained that his citations and evidence were "competent and unprejudiced". Concerned that his historical arguments in Since Cumorah were overshadowing the main message of the Book of Mormon, Nibley shifted his writing on the Book of Mormon to focus on sermons about the book's prophetic message. Nibley still wrote about the historicity of the Book of Abraham after 1967.

In his 1988 review of The Complete Works of Hugh Nibley Vol. 1 in BYU Studies, Kent P. Jackson criticized Nibley for lacking sources, using sources selectively, and using sources out of context. Jackson argued that Nibley's early research was his weakest, and that some should not have been published in his collected works. In response, Louis Midgley defended Nibley's methodology, and wrote that Jackson denied the possibility of comparative studies, since all historical scholarship "involves selection among alternatives".

Eugene England's review of Since Cumorah and Approaching Zion, volumes 7 and 9 of Nibley's collected works, identified Nibley as a Cassandra figure. England noted that Nibley's social commentary on preserving the environment, avoiding war, and opposing prosperity theology often went ignored. England praised Nibley's clear prose and witty satire, identifying the absence of the speech "Leaders to Managers: The Fatal Shift" as a major flaw in the volumes.

In a 2000 issue of Dialogue, Douglas F. Salmon examined Nibley's comparative method, focusing on his series of articles on Enoch written for the Ensign titled "A Strange Thing in the Land: The Return of the Book of Enoch". Salmon noted that some of the parallels Nibley found between the Pearl of Great Price and ancient texts were extremely selective, and others were imprecise, inconsequential, or misrepresented sources: "parallelomania". Salmon concluded that appropriate parallels must discuss the ancient work's language, culture, and context. In response, Hamblin stated in The FARMS Review of Books that even though Nibley had made a few errors, that was not cause to dismiss his entire argument about the Pearl of Great Price's parallels with ancient texts about Enoch. Hamblin accused Salmon of ignoring what FARMS researchers have said about the methodology of parallels, and of erroneously finding errors in Nibley's research.

In Jerald and Sandra Tanner's Salt Lake City Messenger, Ronald V. Huggins wrote in 2008 that Nibley "modifies his quotations to artificially render them more supportive", and provided several examples. Shirley S. Ricks wrote a response in the FARMS Review of Books. Drawing on the experience of the people who checked Nibley's footnotes, she explained that editors or typists could introduce errors. She stated that some of Nibley's published work was not intended for publication, like his speeches, and that fact-checkers had to supply footnotes on their own. Ricks, along with apologists associated with FAIR (formerly FairMormon), assert that while Nibley's arguments could be overly-aggressive, and his footnotes could have errors for many reasons, Nibley did not fabricate his sources. Addressing Huggins's criticisms directly, Ricks argued that Nibley's translation style could be more poetic than literal, and that Nibley saw translation as a commentary in itself.

Nibley's magnum opus, One Eternal Round, was published as volume 19 of his collected works in 2012, with additional writing by Michael D. Rhodes. Gary P. Gillum, the ancient studies librarian during the time Nibley worked at BYU, reviewed the book in BYU Studies. Gillum summarized the book as a "comprehensive look at Facsimile No. 2". Nibley and Rhodes argue that parallels between Egyptian religion and "Joseph Smith's explanation of Facsimile No. 2" are not convenient selections but major theological themes in both Egyptian and LDS religion, thus providing support for the authenticity of Joseph Smith's revelations.

Egyptologist John Gee, a student of Nibley and contemporary Mormon apologist, wrote, "Nibley has a tendency to use myth for history and to flatten the chronology of sources from a variety of periods to create his historical portrait." Ariel Bybee Laughton, a scholar of early Christianity, wrote that Nibley's writing on early Christianity "displays the seams and cracks of a methodology largely founded upon apologetic motivation."

== Legacy ==
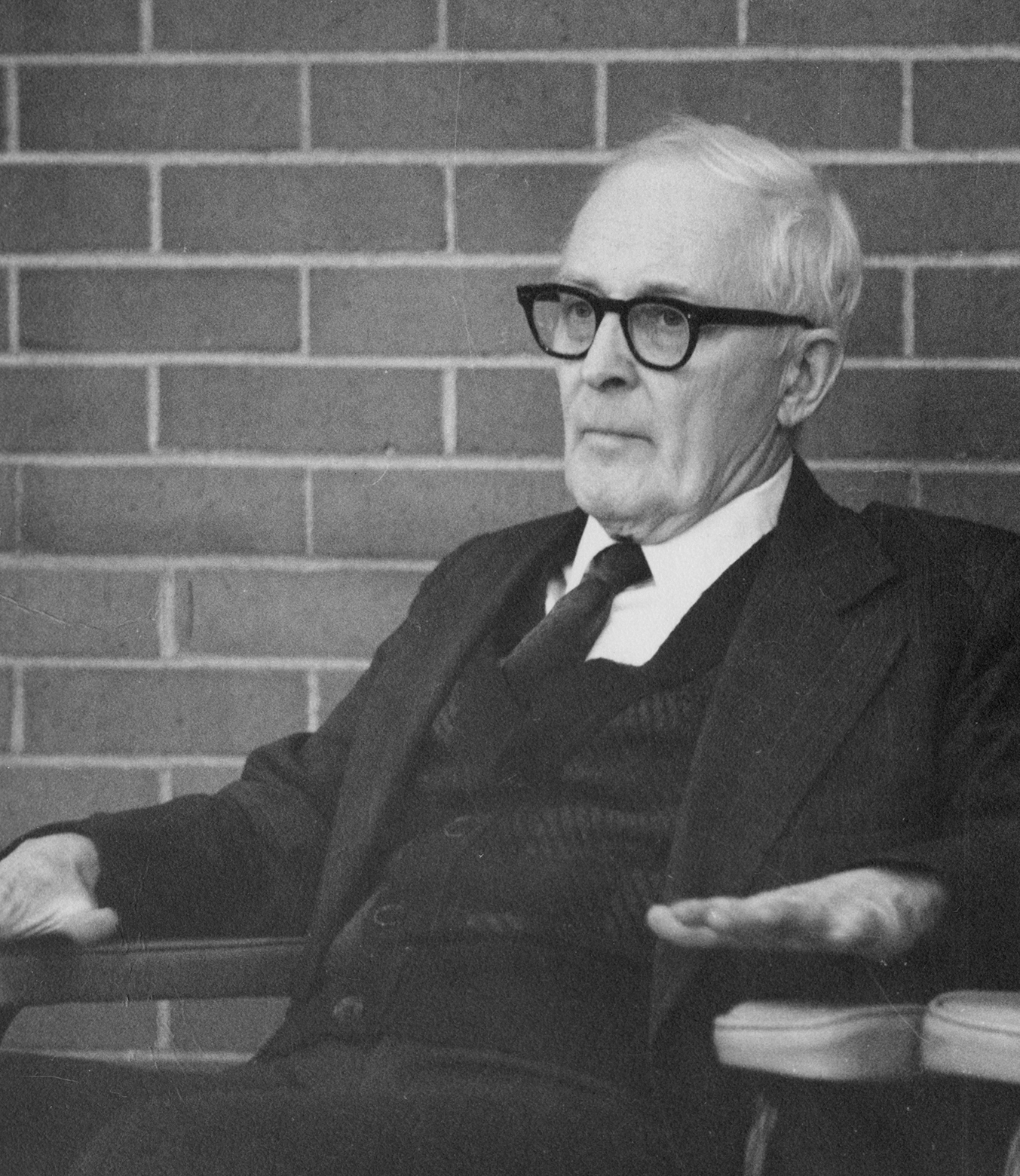
Nibley at Westminster college in 1976

From 1982 to 1984, Hugh's son Alex Nibley organized the filming of interviews with Nibley to use in a documentary about his life called Faith of an Observer. Sterling Van Wagenen was a producer. It premiered at Hugh's special 75th birthday celebration at BYU. After John Welch organized FARMS, he and Deseret Book agreed to co-publish a collected works of Hugh Nibley. The first volume was published in 1986 and 14 volumes were printed by 2002. FARMS also published a two-volume Festschrift in honor of Nibley's 80th birthday. The collection included essays by Aziz Atiya, James Charlesworth, Cyrus Gordon, Jacob Milgrom, Jacob Neusner, and Raphael Patai. When the Ancient Studies Reading Room in the Harold B. Lee Library was relocated in 2001, it was renamed the Hugh Nibley Ancient Studies Reading Room. Alex Nibley later compiled Hugh's World War II memories in Sargeant Nibley, PhD, which was published in 2006. He gave the materials for his final book to FARMS in the fall of 2002, which was published in March 2010 as commemoration for what would have been his 100th birthday. His obituary reported that he was fluent in 14 languages. In 2021, the Interpreter Foundation and Eborn books published Hugh Nibley Observed, which collected the speeches given at the 2010 commemoration of Nibley's centennial as well as tributes and Nibley folklore.

Nibley was a Mormon folk legend during his lifetime, and frequently members of the LDS Church told fantastic stories about him. A Sunstone magazine article documenting several common folk stories (some of questionable veracity) reported that Latter-day Saints would talk of Nibley, for example, shouting quotes from the Illiad while a parachutist in World War II in an attempt to convince Greeks he was friendly, or absent-mindedly recommending German readings to a student without considering the student's inability to read the language. In her thesis on Nibley folklore, Jane Brady found that Nibley stories could be organized into five categories based on the role Nibley played in them: hero, iconoclast, eccentric, spiritual guide, and defender of the faith. Brady put Nibley stories into the context of folklore stories, stating that they illustrated ways that the people who told the stories within BYU's community felt about their own roles as LDS scholars.

Nibley's 1963 speech "Three Shrines: Mantic, Sophic, and Sophistic" distinguished between the sophic and mantic, or a classical tradition of distinguishing between the natural and supernatural. H. Curtis Wright, a professor in BYU's library science program, described Nibley's work with sophic and mantic as "the most insightful thing [Nibley] has ever done" describing the idea as "far more basic than the epistemological disjunction of reason and the senses".

== Personal life ==
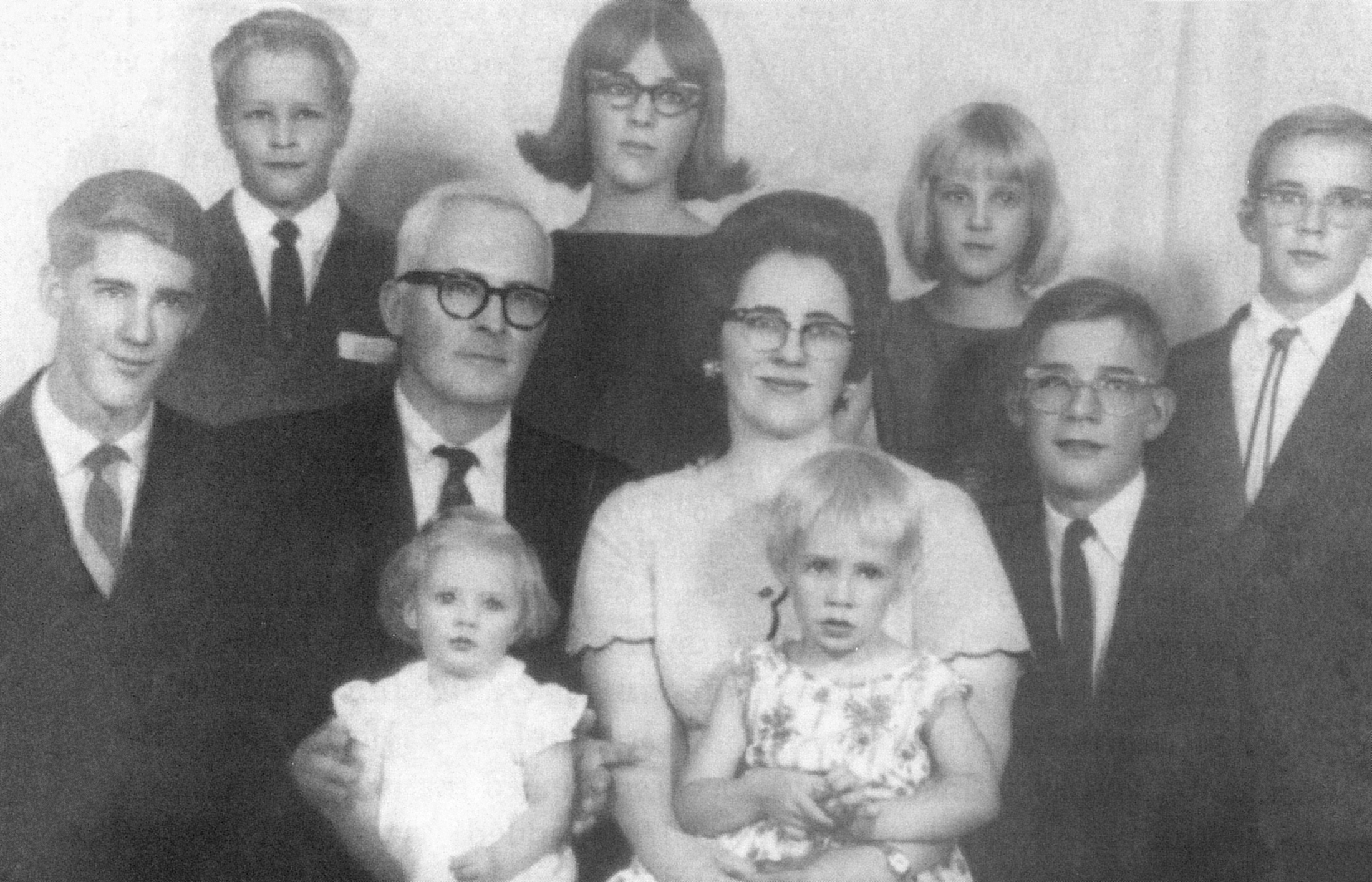
Hugh and Phyllis Nibley with their children in 1966

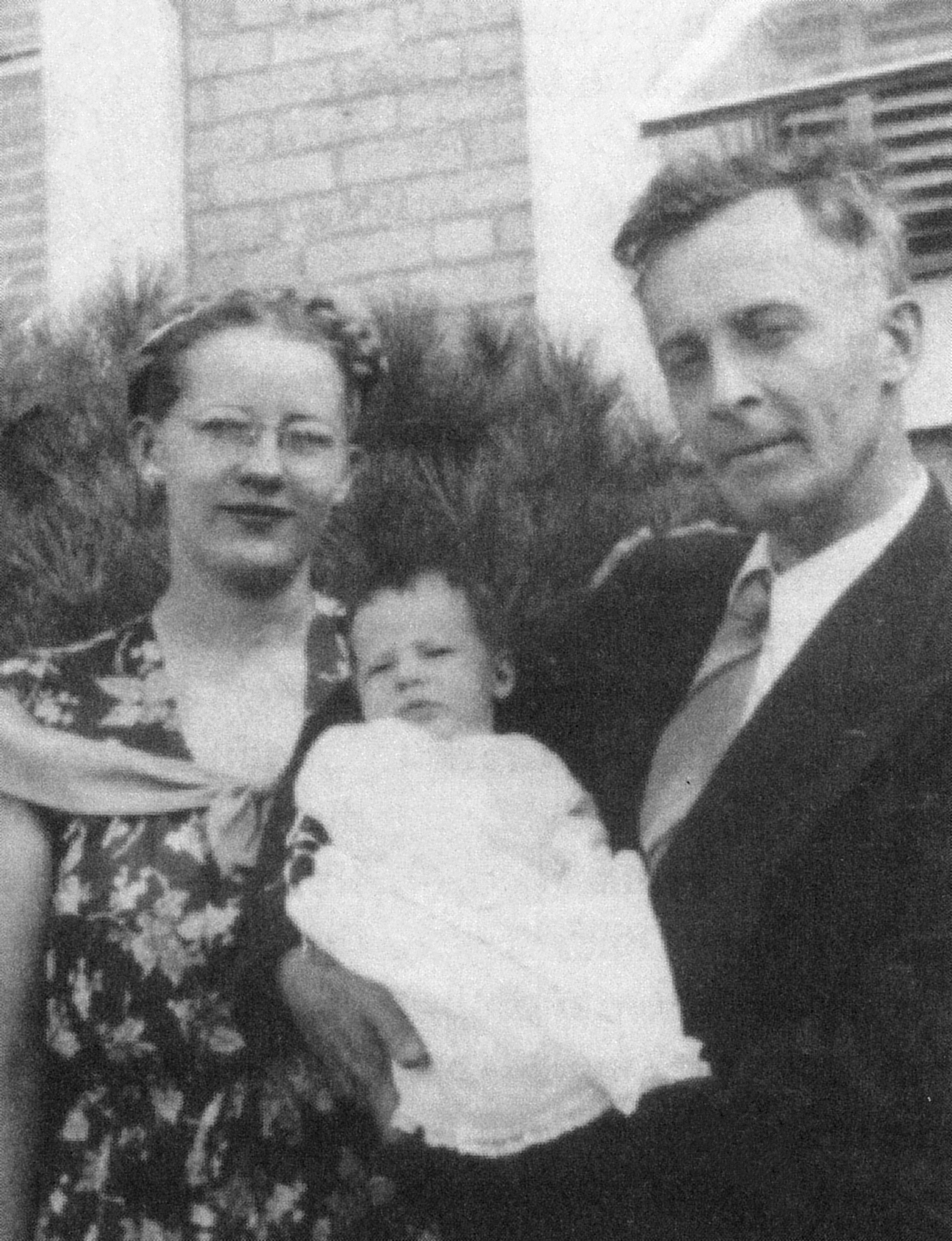
Hugh, Phyllis, and Paul Nibley in 1947

Nibley's parents separated after they lost most of their money and had to sell their mansion in 1941. His mother, Agnes Sloan, or "Sloanie", didn't require him to do chores when he was growing up. Alex Nibley, Hugh's son, described her as sometimes "getting involved to an uncomfortable degree". In her old age, she was unable to live on her own, but suffered from arthritis and paranoia. Hugh's father, later in his life, encouraged families to get involved in "high-risk schemes", and used his relationship to Hugh to gain families' trust.

Nibley met Phyllis Draper (born August 2, 1926) at BYU prior to teaching his first classes there. They married in September 1946 and had eight children. In a collection of folklore about Nibley, Dan McKinley reported that Nibley wrote that Phyllis "knew when to leave [him] alone" in an exhibit of BYU professors' tributes to their wives. Phyllis said that while Nibley enjoyed spending time with his children when they were young, he became distant as they got older. Nibley died on February 24, 2005, in his home in Provo, Utah, at the age of 94. Phyllis Draper Nibley died February 25, 2022, at the age of 95.

=== Martha Beck's claims ===
Nibley's daughter Martha Beck published Leaving the Saints: How I Lost the Mormons and Found My Faith in 2005, describing her departure from the LDS Church, and saying in 1990 that she had recovered repressed memories of childhood sexual abuse by her father. Beck linked the abuse to her father's role as an apologist for the Mormon faith. The book was condemned by the LDS Church. The allegations received national publicity. Nibley had long been aware of the allegations, and denied them. Beck's seven siblings responded, noting about half the Nibley siblings had left the LDS church or were not active in Mormonism and most had taken issue with elements of their father's personality or habits but were unified in their rejection of Beck's claims. In a review of Leaving the Saints for Sunstone magazine, Tania Rands Lyon noted many "internal inconsistencies" in Beck's narrative that argued against the abuse claims and was put off by the relentlessly negative view of Mormonism. Lyon also noted how Beck originally intended for the manuscript to be a novel but changed it to be an autobiography at her publisher's suggestion.

== Selected publications ==
- No Ma'am That's Not History (1946).
- Lehi in the Desert and the World of the Jaredites (1952).
- The Myth Makers (1961).
- What Is a Temple?; The Idea of the Temple in History (1963).
- An Approach to the Book of Mormon (1964).
- Since Cumorah (1967). SBN: 87747-240-8
- The Message of the Joseph Smith Papyri; An Egyptian Endowment (1975). ISBN 0-87747-485-0
- Nibley on the Timely and the Timeless; Classic Essays of Hugh W. Nibley (1978). ISBN 0-88494-338-0
- Abraham in Egypt (1981). ISBN 0-87747-865-1

=== Collected words ===
- ——; Gillum, Gary P.; Norton, Don E.; Welch, John W. (1986). Old Testament and Related Studies. Vol. 1. Foundation for Ancient Research and Mormon Studies. ISBN 0-87579-032-1. Archived from the original on 2017-01-31.
- ——; Ricks, Stephen D. (1986). Enoch the Prophet. Vol. 2. Foundation for Ancient Research and Mormon Studies. ISBN 0-87579-047-X. Archived from the original on 2013-12-20.
- —— (1987). The World and the Prophets. Vol. 3. Foundation for Ancient Research and Mormon Studies. ISBN 0-87579-078-X. Archived from the original on November 5, 2013.
- ——; Compton, Todd M.; Ricks, Stephen D. (1987). Mormonism and Early Christianity. Vol. 4. Foundation for Ancient Research and Mormon Studies. ISBN 0-87579-127-1. Archived from the original on 2013-12-20.
- ——; Callister, Stephen R.; Matthews, Darrell L.; Welch, John W. (1988). Lehi in the Desert/The World of the Jaredites/There Were Jaredites. Vol. 5. Foundation for Ancient Research and Mormon Studies. ISBN 0-87579-132-8. Archived from the original on 2013-12-20.
- —— (1988). An Approach to the Book of Mormon. Vol. 6. Foundation for Ancient Research and Mormon Studies. ISBN 0-87579-138-7. Archived from the original on 2013-12-20.
- —— (1988). Since Cumorah. Vol. 7. Foundation for Ancient Research and Mormon Studies. ISBN 0-87579-139-5. Archived from the original on 2013-12-20.
- —— (1989). The Prophetic Book of Mormon. Vol. 8. Foundation for Ancient Research and Mormon Studies. ISBN 0-87579-179-4. Archived from the original on 2013-12-20.
- ——; Norton, Don E. (1989). Approaching Zion. Vol. 9. Foundation for Ancient Research and Mormon Studies. ISBN 0-87579-252-9. Archived from the original on 2013-12-20.
- ——; Parry, Donald W.; Ricks, Stephen D. (1991). Ancient State: The Rulers & the Ruled. Vol. 10. Foundation for Ancient Research and Mormon Studies. ISBN 0-87579-375-4. Archived from the original on 2013-12-20.
- ——; Whittaker, David J. (1991). Tinkling Cymbals and Sounding Brass: The Art of Telling Tales about Joseph Smith and Brigham Young. Vol. 11. Foundation for Ancient Research and Mormon Studies. ISBN 0-87579-516-1. Archived from the original on 2013-12-20.
- ——; Norton, Don E. (1992). Temple and Cosmos: Beyond This Ignorant Present. Vol. 12. Foundation for Ancient Research and Mormon Studies. ISBN 0-87579-523-4. Archived from the original on 2015-07-09.
- ——; Norton, Don E.; Ricks, Shirley S. (1994). Brother Brigham Challenges the Saints. Vol. 13. Foundation for Ancient Research and Mormon Studies. ISBN 0-87579-818-7. Archived from the original on 2013-12-20.
- —— (2000). Abraham in Egypt. Vol. 14. Foundation for Ancient Research and Mormon Studies. ISBN 1-57345-527-X. Archived from the original on 2013-12-20.
- ——; Hall, John F.; Welch, John W. (2005). Apostles and Bishops in Early Christianity. Vol. 15. Foundation for Ancient Research and Mormon Studies. ISBN 1590383893.
- —— (2006b). The Message of Joseph Smith Papyri: An Egyptian Endowment. Vol. 16. Foundation for Ancient Research and Mormon Studies. ISBN 1-59038-539-X.
- —— (2008). Eloquent Witness: Nibley on Himself, Others, and the Temple. Vol. 17. Foundation for Ancient Research and Mormon Studies. ISBN 978-1-60641-003-5.
- ——; Gee, John (2009). An Approach to the Book of Abraham. Vol. 18. Foundation for Ancient Research and Mormon Studies. ISBN 978-1-60641-054-7.
- ——; Rhodes, Michael D.; Lyon, Michael P. (2010). One Eternal Round. Vol. 19. Foundation for Ancient Research and Mormon Studies. ISBN 978-1-60641-237-4.

== Bibliography ==
- Brady, Jane (1996). The Brigham Young University Folklore of Hugh Winder Nibley: Gifted Scholar, Eccentric Professor and Latter-Day Saint Spiritual Guide. Provo, Utah: Brigham Young University.
- Bushman, Richard Lyman (2010). "Hugh Nibley and Joseph Smith". Journal of Book of Mormon Studies. 19 (1): 4–13. doi:10.5406/jbookmormotheres.19.1.0004. S2CID 254364342.
- Helfrich, Ronald (2021). Mormon Studies: A Critical History. Jefferson, North Carolina: McFarland & Company, Inc. ISBN 9781476682617.
- Laughton, Ariel Bybee (2014). "Apostasy's ancestors: anti-Arian and anti-Mormon discourse in the struggle for Christianity". In Wilcox, Miranda; Young, John D. (eds.). Standing apart: Mormon historical consciousness and the concept of apostasy. Oxford University Press.
- Lundquist, John M.; Ricks, Stephen D., eds. (1990). By Study and Also by Faith. Deseret Book Company. ISBN 0875793398.
- Midgley, Louis (1990). "Hugh Winder Nibley: Bibliography and Register". In Lundquist, John M.; Ricks, Stephen D. (eds.). By Study and Also By Faith: Essays in Honor of Hugh W. Nibley on the Occasion of His Eightieth Birthday. Vol. 1. Salt Lake City, Utah: Foundation for Ancient Research and Mormon Studies. ISBN 0875793398.
- Nibley, Alex (2006a). Sargeant Nibley, PhD: Memories of an Unlikely Screaming Eagle. Utah: Shadow Mountain. ISBN 1573458457.
- Nibley, Hugh (1991). "Three Shrines: Mantic, Sophic, and Sophistic". In Parry, Donald W.; Ricks, Stephen D. (eds.). The Ancient State: The Rulers and the Ruled. The Collected Works of Hugh Nibley. Vol. 10 Ancient History. Salt Lake City: Deseret Book Company. ISBN 0875793754.
- Petersen, Boyd (2002). Hugh Nibley: A Consecrated Life. Salt Lake City: Greg Kofford Books. ISBN 1-58958-020-6.
- Spencer, Joseph M. (2021). "Standing on the (Shrugging) Shoulders of a Giant: Notes on Hugh Nibley's Contribution to Book of Mormon Studies". Journal of Book of Mormon Studies. 30: 90–110. doi:10.5406/jbookmormstud2.30.2021.0090. S2CID 254346180.
- Wright, H. Curtis (Summer 1991). "A Sophic and a Mantic People". BYU Studies. 31 (3): 51–65. JSTOR 43041518.
