= Arnold K. Garr =

American church historian (born 1944)

Arnold Kent Garr (born June 14, 1944) was the chair of the department of Church History and Doctrine at Brigham Young University (BYU) from 2006 to 2009. He was also the lead editor of the Encyclopedia of Latter-day Saint History.

== Biography ==
Garr was born and raised in Ogden, Utah. As a young man, Garr served a mission for the Church of Jesus Christ of Latter-day Saints (LDS Church) in Finland. Garr married Cherie Burns in the Salt Lake Temple on November 20, 1967, and they are the parents of five children.

In the LDS Church, among other callings, Garr has served as a bishop, counselor to a stake president, member of a stake high council and branch president. He served as a member of the Church Correlation Committee from 2001 to 2009.

Late in his life Garr took up running and he completed eleven marathons after turning sixty.

=== Education ===
Garr received a bachelor's degree in History from Weber State University, a master's degree in History from Utah State University, and a Ph.D. in American History, minoring in LDS Church history, from BYU in 1986.

=== Career ===
Garr began his career with the Church Educational System (CES) as a seminary teacher at Roy High School in Utah. He later served as director of the Institutes of Religion in Rochester, New York; Boulder, Colorado; and Tallahassee, Florida. After 21 years with CES, Garr joined the BYU faculty in 1991. He taught at the BYU Jerusalem Center during 1996–97 and was later the chair of the Department of Church History and Doctrine.

== Publications ==
- Garr, Arnold K. (1973). A History of Brigham Young College, Logan, Utah (Master's thesis). Department of History, Utah State University..
- Garr, Arnold K. (1986). A History of Liahona the Elder's Journal: A Magazine Published For the Mormon Missions of America, 1903-1945 (Doctoral thesis). Department of History, Brigham Young University..
- Garr, Arnold K. (1992). Christopher Columbus: A Latter-day Saint Perspective. Provo, Utah: Religious Studies Center, Brigham Young University. ISBN 0-88494-842-0.
- Garr, Arnold K.; Johnson, Clark V., eds. (1994). Missouri. Regional Studies in Latter-day Saint Church History. Provo, Utah: Department of Church History and Doctrine, Brigham Young University.
- Garr, Arnold K. (2000). "Theodore Roosevelt and the Latter-day Saints". Out of Obscurity: The LDS Church in the Twentieth Century. 29th Annual Sidney B. Sperry Symposium. Provo, Utah: Deseret Book. ISBN 1-57345-842-2.
- Garr, Arnold K.; Cannon, Donald Q.; Cowan, Richard O., eds. (2000). Encyclopedia of Latter-Day Saint History. Holzapfel, Richard Neitzel (photographic editor). Salt Lake City, Utah: Deseret Book. ISBN 1-57345-822-8. OCLC 44634356.
- Garr, Arnold K. (Fall 2000). "Bishop Daniel S. Tuttle: Episcopalian Pioneer Among the Mormons" (PDF). Mormon Historical Studies. 1 (2): 78–80.
- Garr, Arnold K. (2002). "Which Are the Most Important Mormon Books?". BYU Studies. 41 (3): 35–47.
- Cannon, Donald Q.; Garr, Arnold K.; Van Orden, Bruce A., eds. (2004). The New England States. Regional Studies in Latter-day Saint Church History. Vol. 5. Provo, Utah: Religious Studies Center, Brigham Young University. ISBN 0-8425-2583-1. Archived from the original on 2011-06-12.
- Kettley, Marlene C.; Arnold K. Garr; Craig K. Manscill (2006). Mormon Thoroughfare: A History of the Church in Illinois, 1830-1839. Provo, Utah: Religious Studies Center, Brigham Young University. ISBN 0-8425-2652-8.
- Garr, Arnold K. (2007). Joseph Smith: Presidential Candidate. Setting the Record Straight. Orem, Utah: Millennial Press. ISBN 978-1-932597-53-0.

== Sources ==
- BYU faculty bio
