= Richard O. Cowan =

American historian (born 1934)

Richard Olsen Cowan (born 1934) is a historian of the Church of Jesus Christ of Latter-day Saints (LDS Church) and a former professor in the Church History Department of Brigham Young University (BYU). He was one of the longest-serving BYU faculty and the longest-serving member of the Church History Department ever.

== Biography ==
Cowan was raised in Los Angeles. He is legally blind, having retinitis pigmentosa since birth, and by 2000, he had lost nearly all vision.

=== Missionary Service ===
Halfway through his undergraduate and graduate degrees, Cowan served a mission for the Church of Jesus Christ of Latter-day Saints in the Spanish-American mission, among the Mexican immigrants in Texas and New Mexico from 1953 to 1956. Cowan tells of one instance when he was able to use his braille scriptures to prove his gospel knowledge to another minister. On his mission, he met Dawn Houghton, which he later married, and decided to teach religion at Brigham Young University.

=== Education ===
Cowan received his Bachelor of Arts in political science at Occidental College in 1958. He received an M.A. in 1959 and a Ph.D. in 1961 in American History, both from Stanford University. In 1959, he received an award from President Dwight D. Eisenhower, selected as one of four visually handicapped students in the United States.

=== Career ===
Beginning in 1961, Cowan was a professor of Church History and Doctrine at Brigham Young University. Cowan received BYU’s professor of the year award in 1965. He has taught at the BYU Jerusalem Center and in the spring of 2007 was a visiting professor at BYU-Hawaii. He retired from BYU in 2015.

=== Temples ===
Cowan has focused a good portion of his scholarship on temples and has been sought out by the media and academics for his expertise.

Cowan followed the construction of the Provo Utah Temple closely. He attended the dedication in 1972 and was moved by the proceedings. He wrote some of his memories of the time and compiled other people's memories into his 2015 book Provo's Two Temples.

== Church positions ==
Among other positions in the Church, Cowan has served as a stake patriarch.

== Writings ==
Cowan helped write the Sunday School manual for the Church of Jesus Christ of Latter-day Saints from 1978 to 1980, on the Doctrine and Covenants and LDS history.

In 1972, the Church planned a new sixteen-volume sesquicentennial history to be published in 1980, and Cowan was commissioned to write about the 20th century. These contracts were all canceled in 1981, but Cowan still completed and published his volume as The Church in the Twentieth Century in 1985.

From 1981 to 1993, Cowan served as the chair of the committee in charge of preparing Gospel Doctrine lessons for the Church. Among his books are Temples to Dot the Earth (1997), California Saints, A 150-year Legacy in the Golden State; The Church in the Twentieth Century (Salt Lake City: Bookcraft, 1985); The Latter-day Saint Century, which covered about the same topic but was written 15 years later. He also co-wrote a book with Donald Q. Cannon about the international church. Cowan, along with Cannon and Arnold K. Garr, was one of the editors of the Encyclopedia of Latter-day Saint History. He wrote the article on the history of the Church from 1945 until 1990 (or basically as recent as he could at the time) for the Encyclopedia of Mormonism. He also wrote the articles for History of Temples, Missionary Training Centers, Branch, and Branch President.

He was a co-editor with John P. Livingstone and Craig J. Ostler of The Mormons: An Illustrated History of the Church of Jesus Christ of Latter-day Saints, published in 2013.

In 2015, BYU’s Religious Studies Center published his Provo's Two Temples book.
