= Donald Q. Cannon =

American academic

Donald Quayle Cannon (born 1936) is a retired professor at Brigham Young University who specializes in Latter-day Saint history, particularly early Latter-day Saint history and international Latter-day Saint history.

As a young man, Cannon was a missionary for the Church of Jesus Christ of Latter-day Saints (LDS Church) in Germany. Cannon earned his bachelor's and master's degrees at the University of Utah. Cannon holds a Ph.D. from Clark University. In the late 1960s, he taught at the University of Southern Maine.

In the LDS Church he has served as a bishop and branch president.

Among other works, Cannon was one of the editors of the Encyclopedia of Latter-day Saint History and of the Historical Atlas of Mormonism. He has also been an editor for works in the Regional Studies in Latter-day Saint History series.

== Works ==
- Donald Q. Cannon, Larry E. Dahl, and John W. Welch, “The Restoration of Major Doctrines through Joseph Smith: The Godhead, Mankind, and the Creation,” Ensign, January 1989, p. 27
- Garr, Arnold K.; Cannon, Donald Q.; Cowan, Richard O., eds. (2000). Encyclopedia of Latter-Day Saint History. Salt Lake City, Utah: Deseret Book. ISBN 1-57345-822-8. OCLC 44634356.
- The Nauvoo Legion in Illinois: A History of the Mormon Militia, 1841-1846 (2010) with Richard E. Bennett and Susan Easton Black.
- Mapping Mormonism: An Atlas of Latter-day Saint History (2012) with Brandon S. Plewe (editor-in-chief) and S. Kent Brown and Richard H. Jackson
