= Richard H. Jackson (geographer) =

American geographer

Richard H. Jackson (born 1941) is a geography professor at Brigham Young University (BYU) who specializes in historical geography. He is also a charter member of the American Planning Association.

Jackson holds bachelor's and master's degrees from BYU and a Ph.D. from Clark University. He has been a faculty member at BYU since 1969 and has also worked as a consultant to the Utah Historical Society as well as businesses and municipalities.

Jackson has served as the editor of the Great Lakes-Rocky Mountain Geographical Journal and the Journal of Town and Country Planning Annual. He has also served on the editorial board of the Journal of Cultural Geography and the Journal of Pilgrimage Studies.

Among his books are Genealogical Atlas of the United States (1976), The Mormon Role in the Settlement of the West (1978) and a large collections of works written with Llody Hudman. Jackson was also an editor of the Historical Atlas of Mormonism along with S. Kent Brown and Donald Q. Cannon. Jackson has also written numerous articles, including three for the Encyclopedia of Mormonism.

Jackson has also served on the Orem City Council.

== Sources ==
- Jackson's Vita
- BYU bio
- list of some books by Jackson
- Chapter on the "Mormon West" by Jackson from Gary J. Hausladen's Western Places, American Myths.
