= S. Kent Brown =

American historian and bishop

Scott Kent Brown (born 1940) is an emeritus American professor of ancient scripture at Brigham Young University (BYU) where he was also the director of ancient studies and for three years head of the university's Jerusalem Center.

== Biography ==
Brown received his B.A. from the University of California, Berkeley in classical Greek with a minor in Near Eastern Studies. He then went on to receive his Ph.D. from Brown University. He joined the faculty of BYU in 1971. From 1978-1979 he was a fellow of the American Research Center in Egypt. From 1993-1996 he was the director of the BYU Jerusalem Center, a position he again held from 2009 until August 2010. He has also served as a fellow of the David M. Kennedy Center for International Studies.

In the Church of Jesus Christ of Latter-day Saints, Brown has served, among other callings, as a bishop.

Brown served as an editor of the Encyclopedia of Mormonism and as the managing editor of the Coptic Encyclopedia. He has also been an editor of the Journal of Book of Mormon Studies. He also edited the Historical Atlas of Mormonism along with Donald Q. Cannon and Richard H. Jackson.

Brown has written and edited a wide variety of books dealing with Lehi, the Book of Mormon, Judaism between Malachi and the New Testament, the New Testament and Pearl of Great Price. He also wrote a book

Brown was a consultant in the production of the film The Prince of Egypt. He was also the Executive Producer and a commentator in the documentaries "Journey of Faith", "Journey of Faith: The New World", and "The Messiah: Behold the Lamb of God".

Brown is married to the former Gayle Oblad. They are the parents of five children.

One of his daughters is novelist Heather B. Moore and they co-wrote the book Divinity of Women: Inspiration and Insights From Women of the Scriptures.

== Sources ==
- Parry et al., ed., Echoes and Evidences of the Book of Mormon, (Provo: FARMS, 2002) p. 501.
