= Åsa Waldau =

Former religious sect leader

Åsa Maria Waldau
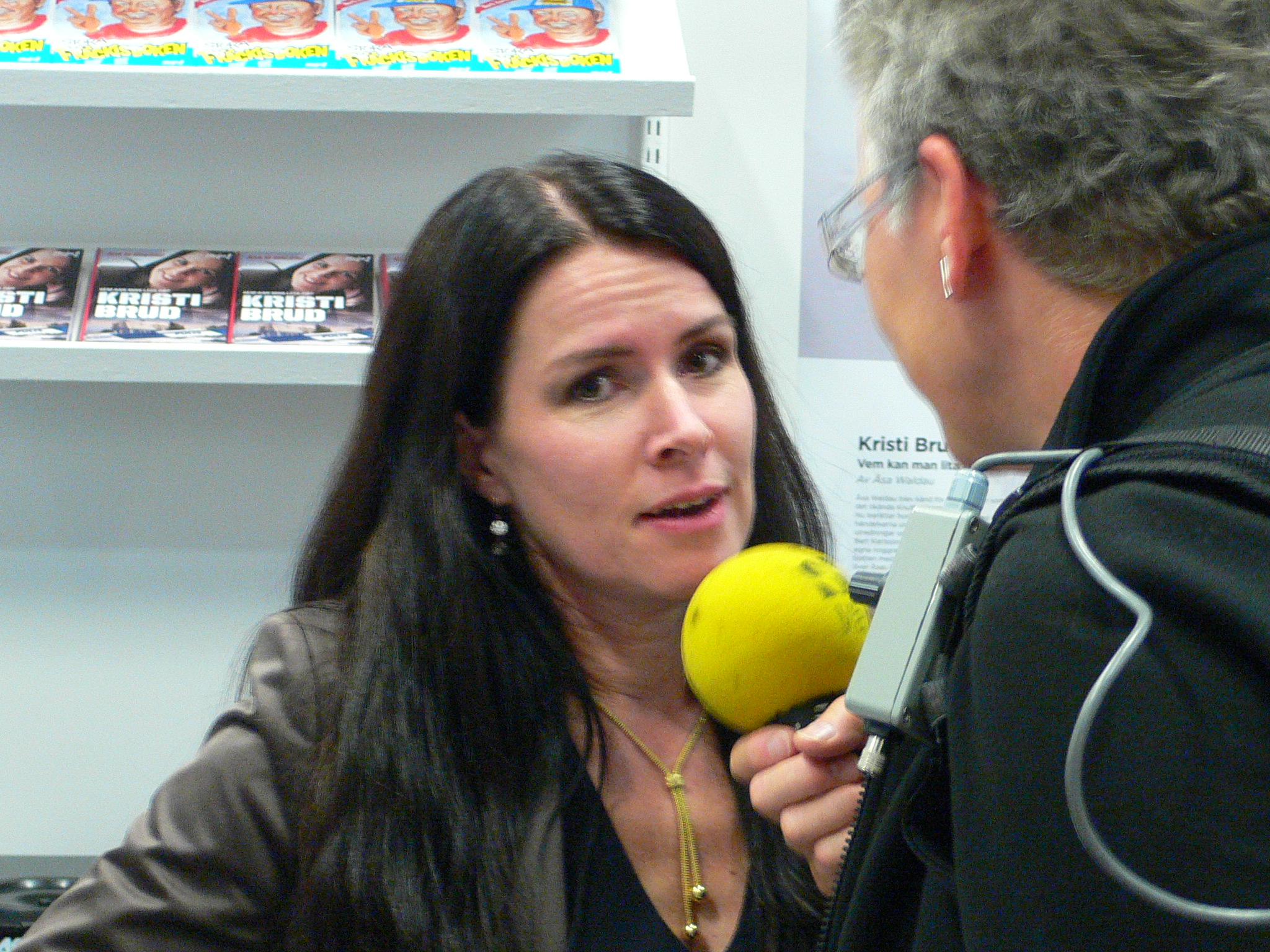
- Born: October 26, 1965 (age 61); Örebro, Sweden
- Education: highschool
- Occupations: Pastor, singer
- Spouse: Patrik Waldau (1994–2016)
- Children: two
- Parent(s): Matz Jacobsson and Lillemor Wikström

Åsa M. Waldau (Swedish pronunciation: [ˈǒːsa maˈrǐːa ˈvǎldaʊ]; born October 26, 1965) is the former leader of a Christian sect in Knutby, Sweden, that disbanded in 2016. She is one of four sisters, the youngest of whom was the victim of the Knutby murder on January 10, 2004.

== Biography ==
In 1985, Waldau completed one month of theological training at a Pentecostal Bible school in Stockholm. In 1990, Waldau (née Björk) was hired by the Pentecostal church in Uppsala as a children's pastor. However, because of her actions and her divorce, she was forced to resign. She then moved to Knutby, where she lived with the Waldau family and befriended their young son, Patrik (born 1975), in Uppsala. They married in June 1994.

The Pentecostal congregation of Knutby hired Waldau part-time in March 1992. Kim Wincent, whom she had met in Bible school in 1985, was a pastor there. Waldau's authority over the congregants rapidly increased after she declared herself to be the "bride of Christ" (Swedish: Kristi brud) personified. There were claims of prophecies about a "disrespected servant of the Lord" who would be the cause of a "fire from Knutby". She traveled widely in Swedish Pentecostal communities, inducing young people to move to Knutby. In 1997, she convinced Helge Fossmo and his wife, Heléne, to join the Knutby community as a pastor.

In 2020, Waldau and two pastors from the Knutby congregation were convicted of assault against members of their church. Her sentence was conditional release, plus 120 hours of community service.

== Teachings ==
The Philadelphia congregation in Knutby was established in 1921 during the Pentecostal revival in Sweden connected with Lewi Pethrus. Waldau was the granddaughter of Pethrus's successor, Willis Säwe, but her mother did not raise her in the faith. She was "born again", entered the Pentecostal tradition, and was also influenced by Ulf Ekman and his Livets Ord movement, as well as by Word of Faith.

The eschatology is pretribulationist. As the self-proclaimed "bride of Christ", Waldau expected that she would be taken away before the so-called Rapture, in a manner reminiscent of the dormition of the Virgin or the assumption of Mary, to be united with her "bridegroom".

== Connection with the Knutby murder ==
In January 2004, Waldau's sister, Alexandra Fossmo, was murdered. Alexandra’s neighbour and employer, Daniel Linde, was also shot and wounded. Later, Sara Svensson, nanny for the children of Alexandra's husband, Helge Fossmo, confessed to the murders. She claimed she acted under the influence of Helge, with whom she was having an affair (but who was also having an affair with Linde's wife, Annette).

Helge Fossmo (allegedly with help from Waldau) exploited his extramarital relationship with Svensson to manipulate her into going forward with the assassination. He claimed to get text messages from God on his cellphone, which told him Svensson would not get mercy from God if she did not kill Alexandra (his wife) and their neighbour, Daniel Linde.

In 2004, Fossmo was arrested, prosecuted, and sentenced to life in prison for conspiracy to murder, and Svensson was sentenced to psychiatric care. Although Waldau was a close associate of Fossmo, there was a null investigation and no evidence linking her involvement to the murder plot and she was never prosecuted—at trial, prosecutor Anne Sjöblom maintained this 'close association' (and Waldau's self-anointed title, "the Bride of Christ") be withheld from the official record.

== Celebrity ==
After the murders, Waldau continued to be very reclusive. She refused to be interviewed by newspapers and only appeared without speaking in the TV4 documentary A Fall from Grace. Her first appearance was at the trial in May 2004, speaking in court as a relative of her sister who had been murdered. She admitted that she had 'tested' whether she might be the Bride of Christ, an idea she attributed to Helge Fossmo.

In September 2004, Waldau was featured in a one-hour interview program on Sveriges Television by Stina Lundberg Dabrowski. The public's reaction was quite negative; Waldau came across as 'cold' and 'unfeeling'.

In March 2005, Waldau inspired the sect to open a spa. In November she released a music CD containing songs from the church of Knutby. In December she appeared on a discussion panel at the celebration of 175 years Aftonbladet, introduced there by Jan Guillou as Sweden's most maligned person in modern times.

In June 2006, the talk-show host Lennart Persson invited Waldau to his last installment of Debatt on national television, where she got into exchanges with Janne Josefsson and with Bert Karlsson. Bert Karlsson later that year invited her to his own program on the cable channel TV8. In October 2007 he published Waldau's autobiography, Kristi brud: vem kan man lita på? (English: Bride of Christ: whom can one trust?).

In April 2021, HBO Europe premiered Swedish-American docuseries, Pray, Obey, Kill, investigating the January 2004 Knutby murder. The series is primarily focused on Helge Fossmo and Åsa Waldau's involvement in the murder. Even though Waldau is featured in all six episodes, she declined to participate in the docuseries. Waldau remains a free woman and has changed her name.
