= Helge Fossmo =

Swedish pastor

- Born: Helge Arnold Fossmo; 27 July 1971 (age 55); Björneborg, Sweden
- Occupation: Pastor
- Spouse(s): Heléne Fossmo († 1999); Alexandra Fossmo († 2004); Unnamed spouse (2007–)
- Children: 3
- Status: Imprisoned at the Tidaholm Maximum Security Prison (2004–2022); paroled in 2022
- Criminal charges: 2004 – Solicitation of the Knutby murder
- Penalty: Life imprisonment

Helge Arnold Fossmo (born 27 July 1971) is a Swedish Pentecostal pastor sentenced to life imprisonment for solicitation of the Knutby murder in Sweden in 2004.

== Life before Knutby ==
Helge Fossmo was born to Norwegian parents in the village of Björneborg, close to Kristinehamn in Värmland County. The family was not particularly religious, but when he was about ten years old Fossmo joined the scouting organization of the Mission Covenant Church in Björneborg. Not long before he turned twelve he became a "born again" Christian. He went to high school in Kristinehamn, where he volunteered at a Christian youth café. At age 17 he met Heléne Johansson, his future wife.

In 1989 he joined the Pentecostal church of Kristinehamn, where Johansson also was a member. After graduation, he studied in Karlstad to become a science teacher, eventually dropping out. For a while he worked as a teacher in his old school in Björneborg.

In the spring of 1993, Fossmo was involved with Jaspis. In Kristinehamn this was a small group inspired by Ulf Ekman's Livets Ord, part of the Word of Faith movement. After a few months, however, he left Jaspis and rejoined the Pentecostal church. He was then employed as a youth pastor. In May 1995, he organized a March for Jesus. The Christian newspaper Dagen published Fossmo's experience of xenoglossy.

Fossmo met Åsa Waldau for the first time in August 1993. The main pastor Claes Frankner had invited her to Kristinehamn from Knutby. His son Samuel was already an adherent of Waldau's and moved to Knutby in 1994. The Fossmos moved there in August 1997 with their two children (a third child was born in Knutby).

== Work in Knutby ==
In Knutby, Fossmo and Waldau started in 1997 a month-long training school, which has been held three times a year since then. It attracted young Christians from all over Sweden, some of whom would move to Knutby permanently. Fossmo also started the missionary foundation Aid for Nations. At first it tried to be active in Estonia. Later this foundation organized bible schools in Coimbatore (India) and in Hongkong.

Fossmo's web page with Christian links is dominated by Word of Faith (Livets Ord, Morris Cerullo, Kenneth Hagin, Benny Hinn, John Avanzini, Kenneth Copeland), but also includes Pentecostalism (IBRA Radio, Kensington Temple, Oral Roberts) and others (Willow Creek Community Church, Ray Stedman). The web page also shows strong support for the State of Israel. Later, Fossmo was photographed with the Israeli ambassador, Zvi Mazel and the ambassador also invited Fossmo to the embassy as he was seen as a positive voice for Israel.

The Fossmos moved to a house next to Åsa Waldau, and Helge was spending most of his time with her. Reading the Bible, they found that the metaphorical interpretatation of Bride of Christ as the Church is not explicit in the New Testament texts. Fossmo told Waldau that if the Bride were a person, it would have to be her. Waldau then bought a gold ring with seven diamonds. On 29 March 1999, he was the only other person present at the ceremony where Åsa Waldau was betrothed to Jesus. She became the Bride of Christ, and also assumed a new name: Tirsa. Fossmo said in court that he had to mediate Jesus to her, by satisfying her sexually with his hands, which Waldau denied.

== Murders, marriages and trials ==
On 18 December 1999, Fossmo found his wife Heléne dead in the bathtub. Although there was a hole in her skull and a toxic concentration of dextropropoxyphene was found in her blood, her death was ruled an accident.

A few months later, Fossmo married Alexandra, Tirsa's youngest sister. In June 2001, Fossmo fell ill. He was nursed by Sara Svensson, who moved into his bedroom. She divorced her husband a year later, but Åsa Waldau did not approve of Fossmo's liaison with her. She was put under church discipline and shunned – in Fossmo's bedroom, where she said she was a sex slave. Pastor Fossmo then coveted his neighbour's wife, Anette Linde. They started an affair in the autumn of 2003. Soon thereafter, Sara Svensson started getting anonymous text messages, which she regarded as prophetic. Together with Fossmo's verbal instructions, these messages convinced her to try to kill Alexandra Fossmo. In the early morning of 8 November 2003, she attacked Alexandra with a hammer. Alexandra woke up and resisted the attack. She called her husband who was out in his car (with his lover, Mss. Linde), as well as some church elders. Sara Svensson was sent away from the community. The assault was not reported to the police, and the Fossmos took a plane to a Bible school in Hong Kong. Secretly, Fossmo and Svensson kept in touch. The anonymous text messages also resumed. Svensson was instructed to buy a handgun (not an easy task in Sweden). She was told to shoot Daniel Linde too. The shootings took place in the early morning of 10 January 2004. Alexandra was shot dead in the head in her bed. Daniel Linde was shot in the chest and in his mouth, but he managed to call emergency services and he survived.

The district court sentenced Fossmo to life imprisonment for solicitation of murder of Alexandra and attempted murder of Daniel Linde, but acquitted him of the murder of Heléne. Fossmo appealed the convictions and the prosecutor appealed the acquittal, but the verdict was upheld. Fossmo's appeal to the Supreme Court was denied. He wrote without success to the Chancellor of Justice. He then appealed to the European Court of Human Rights, but on 13 February 2007, the judges decided not to hear his case.

== Admission of guilt ==
At the end of August 2006, Fossmo admitted guilt in an interview with TV4 and said that he would put his cards on the table for the police. Fossmo also had a new lawyer, Peter Althin. In March 2007, after three interviews, the police decided not to reopen the case.

On 20 July 2007, Helge Fossmo got married in prison. In October 2009, he published an article where he said he was ashamed of what he had done in the cult.

In October 2014, Fossmo's sentence was time-determined by the Örebro District Court, a possibility granted after having serving 10 years of his life sentence. The fixed sentence, of 24 years, meant he would have been released in 2020 on parole, after serving 16 years or two-thirds. In January 2015, the Göta Court of Appeal repealed the decision, on the penalty requirement of at least 24 years of imprisonment for the severity of the crime, so that the application for parole was premature. In late 2019, the court accepted a fixed sentence of 26 years, and was subsequently released in early 2022.
