= Zvi Mazel =

Israeli diplomat

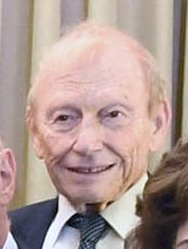
Zvi Mazel portrait

Zvi Mazel (Hebrew: צבי מזאל; born 4 March 1939) is an Israeli diplomat. He has served as the Israeli ambassador to Egypt, Romania, and Sweden.

== Education and work experience ==
Mazel was born in Bnei Brak, and served in the IDF from 1956 to 1958. After initial studies in Israel, Mazel studied political science in France, at the Institut d'Études Politiques de Paris (The Parisian Institute for Political Studies). There he met his wife, Michelle, a political scientist and writer. He graduated in 1963, and joined the diplomatic corps of the Israeli Foreign Ministry in 1966, where he served as a researcher at the Foreign Ministry's Institute of Political Research.

From 1969 to 1973, he served as First Secretary of the Israeli Embassy in Antananarivo, Madagascar, and then served as an attache at the Israeli Embassy in Paris until 1977, when he returned to Israel to again serve as a researcher in the Institute of Political Research.

From 1980 to 1982, he served at the Israeli Embassy in Cairo, during the thaw period between Israel and Egypt that ended with the 1982 Lebanon War. During this period, he also held the post as director of Eastern European division and head of the Egyptian and North African department at the Foreign Ministry.

In 1989 he was posted as ambassador to Romania, where he witnessed the Romanian Revolution.

In 1992 he was appointed Deputy Director of the Foreign Ministry in charge of African affairs and was instrumental in reestablishing diplomatic relations between Israel and 19 African countries. In 1996 he returned to Egypt as an ambassador, and remained five years in that country.

In 2002, he was appointed ambassador to Sweden, and served in this position until 2004. He retired from the foreign service in April 2004 at age 65.

Mazel has written extensively on Israeli-Turkish and Israeli-Egyptian relations, commenting that Erdogan's attempts to reverse Atatürk's secular policies have put him and Turkey at odds with Israel and the Western world. He sees pragmatic elements in the leaders of post-revolution Egypt, but dismisses the Muslim Brotherhood's potential for moderation. He is a fellow of the Jerusalem Center for Public Affairs.

== Ambassadorship to Sweden ==
While serving as ambassador to Sweden, Mazel became a controversial figure in the country. Once, in reaction to a call to highlight that products from Israeli settlements sometimes had been labeled to fit into the EU-Israel tax-free trade agreement, Mazel stated that the Swedish Archbishop K. G. Hammar "probably is an anti-semite." He has also been quoted as saying that Swedish Foreign Minister Anna Lindh's criticism of Israel's alleged human rights violations could not be tolerated. Mazel also called former foreign minister Sten Andersson and Sweden's UN ambassador Pierre Schori "professional anti-Israelis."

At the same time Mazel embraced personalities seen as controversial in Sweden as "Israel-friendly". Most noted was in 2003, when Mazel appeared in a well known picture with Helge Fossmo, at that time only known as leader of an ultra-conservative religious group, later imprisoned as the person behind one of the most highly publicized murder cases in Sweden's modern history, the Knutby murder.

In January 2004, Mazel vandalized the art installation Snow White and The Madness of Truth by Israeli-born Swedish artist Dror Feiler and his wife Gunilla Sköld Feiler. The installation took advantage of the reflecting pool in the courtyard of the Swedish History Museum, that was highlighted and filled with red liquid signifying blood. The work further consisted of plaques with poetry on the surrounding walls and music by J.S. Bach. Well-lit on the surface of a basin: a styrofoam boat, displaying a portrait of the Palestinian suicide bomber Hanadi Jaradat, who had perpetrated the Maxim restaurant suicide bombing a few months earlier, on one side and the word "Snövit" ("Snow White" in Swedish) written on the backside. Mazel pushed some lightstands into the pool, causing a short-circuit and disabling the light, and then told Feiler that: "This is not a work of art. This is an expression of hatred for the Israeli people. This has glorified suicide bombers". Further he said to the press that the piece constituted a "complete legitimization of genocide, the murder of innocent people, innocent civilians, under the guise of culture". Feiler rejected charges that their intention was to glorify suicide bombers and accused Mazel of "practicing censorship". Feiler, who would play at the opening ceremony, refused to begin until Mazel left. Despite trying to explain himself, Mazel was asked to leave and escorted off the premises by museum security. The Swedish Foreign Ministry summoned him to ask for clarifications over the incident.

Mazel stated that "Sweden is among the most severely anti-Semitic places" with "daily agitations in the media to kill Jews." Israeli Prime Minister Ariel Sharon later thanked Mazel "for his stand against the growing wave of anti-Semitism" in Sweden.

In August 2009, the now-retired Mazel responded to the Swedish government's refusal to reprimand the tabloid Aftonbladet for publishing allegations that Israel harvested organs from dead Palestinians. He said that there is no freedom of press in Sweden (Reporters Without Borders, in its 2009 press freedom index rankings showed that Sweden shared the top position with four other countries.) Mazel also said that the Social Democrats control the news with about 80% of Swedish newspapers connected to the Social Democrat movement, including the "four national papers". The newspaper Sydsvenska Dagbladet commented that Mazel perhaps was alluding to the national papers Dagens Nyheter, Svenska Dagbladet, Aftonbladet and Expressen, and noted that of these four, Aftonbladet was the only one with a possible Social Democrat connection, as the trade unions have a 9% share in the newspaper. According to Helle Klein, Mazel's ideas about Sweden may be from people like Helge Fossmo and other Christian extremists.
