= Arab Organization for Human Rights =

Non-governmental organization

- المنظمة العربية لحقوق الإنسان
- Abbreviation: AOHR
- Formation: 1983 in Lymasoul, Cyprus
- Founder: Mr. Mohammed Fayek
- Merger of: Mr. Alaa Shalaby
- Headquarters: Cairo, Egypt
- Region served: Arab region
- Website: aohrarab.com

The Arab Organization for Human Rights (Arabic: المنظمة العربية لحقوق الإنسان, romanized: al-Munaẓẓamah al-ʻArabīyah li-Ḥuqūq al-Insān) is a Non-Governmental Organization (NGO) that works on human rights issues in the Arab World. It was founded with a resolution agreed on in Limassol, Cyprus, in 1983.

Its general Assembly is held every three years, while the Board of Trustees meets annually, and consists of 25 members. 20 of the members are elected, while the remaining 5 are appointed by the AOHR. Its current headquarters is in Cairo, Egypt.

Among the organization's founders were Egypt politician Mohammad Fayek and sociologist Saad Eddin Ibrahim.

== Working fields ==
The organization work focuses on the rights of people in the Arabic-speaking world against torture and persecution. Its work includes campaigns to free political prisoners.

In the organization's words, it aims to

Call for respect of human rights and fundamental freedoms of all citizens and residents of the Arab world; defends any individual whose human rights are subjected to violations which are contrary to the Universal Declaration of Human Rights, the International Covenant on Economic, Social and Cultural Rights and the International Covenant on Civil and Political Rights; endeavour, regardless of political considerations, to obtain release of detained or imprisoned persons, and seek relief and assistance for persons whose freedom is restricted in any way or who are subject to coercion of any kind because of their beliefs and political convictions, or for reasons of race, sex, colour or language; protest in cases where a fair trial is not guaranteed; provide legal assistance where necessary and possible; call for improvements in conditions of prisoners of conscience; work for amnesty of persons sentenced for political reasons.

The AOHR’s goals include educating, training and documenting in the field of human rights.

The AOHR carries out field missions in an effort to release political prisoners, in some cases as an observer and in others as a member of the defence panel. It receives complaints from individuals, groups and organizations and contacts the relevant authorities. In addition to offering legal assistance in several cases, the organization provides financial assistance to families of victims. In coordination with the Arab Lawyers Union, it launched a campaign for Freedom for Prisoners of Conscience in the Arab World. It also arranges conferences and seminars. According to UNESCO it was instrumental in setting up the Arab Institute for Human Rights in Tunisia in 1989, in association with the Arab Lawyers Union, the Tunisian League for the Defence of Human Rights and with the support of the Centre for Human Rights in the United Nations.

AOHR maintains a consultative position at the Economic and Social Council of the United Nations and is also an observer in the Arab League and the African Union.

In December 2023, the Arab Organization for Human Rights reported on Egypt's Presidential election. The report consisted of various aspects of the polling process, and how it affected the Egyptian people. Taking note of certain demographics and how the process was for them. Some of the groups present at the polls included a large amount of women and disabled individuals. AOHR also took note on some negatives of the process. Including, the inability of AOHR members to enter into polling stations, overcrowding and certain political sides stationing themselves in front of the polls and promoting their side.

=== Report on Palestinian Authority ===
In December 2012, AOHR released a report that accused the Palestinian Authority (PA) of "inhumane practices and human rights violations" against Palestinian civilians. The AOHR alleges that from 2007-2011, the PA detained 13,271 Palestinians, and tortured 96% of them, resulting in six deaths. The report claims the PA law enforcement raided universities, hospitals and houses in order to arrest people wanted for protesting against the Israeli occupation. The report also claims that PA officers confiscated equipment and personal cash after arresting the suspects.

=== Work beyond the Arabic-speaking world ===
In 2017, AOHR called on Arab countries and for them to "revisit" their relation with the U.S. This comes after the U.S recognized Jerusalem as the capital of Israel and would move the U.S embassy to Jerusalem. Which the AOHR sees as risking stability and peace in the region, due to ongoing tension between the groups.

The organization called for the investigation of the murder of the Egyptian teen, Mariam Mostafa in Britain. In what has been seen as a hate crime, in relation to Ramadan. The attack happened in July, around the time when Muslims were praying in London. It condemned Britain for these actions. Called for joint action in investigating this, and has commented on British Officials failure in stopping this crime while it was happening. She was attacked by 10 other girls, with only one person stepping in to defend her. The AOHR was very disappointed with Britain and what it described as a "racially motivated" attack.

In 2019, the non-governmental forum of the African Commission on Human Rights assembled in Cairo, Egypt. The Arab Organization for Human Rights was present and spoke out on the issues of public liberties in Arab and African Nations. Bringing up issues in various African Nations, and the growing danger from the armed conflicts.
