= Waldau =

Waldau may refer to:

- Waldau (surname)
- Waldau (Namibia), a farm and train station in the Otjozondjupa region of Namibia
- Waldau (Bern), a psychiatric clinic in Bern, Switzerland
- Waldau (Osterfeld), a village in the municipality of Osterfeld, Saxony-Anhalt, Germany
- Waldau (Kassel), a city quarter of Kassel, Hesse, Germany
- Waldau (Titisee-Neustadt), a village in Baden-Württemberg, Germany
- Waldau (Victoria), a suburb of Melbourne, Australia
- Waldau (Vojvodina), the German name for the village of Sonta, Serbia
- Waldau, the former German name for Wałdowo, a village in Sępólno County, Kuyavian-Pomeranian Voivodeship, in north-central Poland
- Waldau, the former German name for Borówiec, a village in Poznań County, Greater Poland Voivodeship, west-central Poland
