= Dror Feiler =

Swedish musician and activist

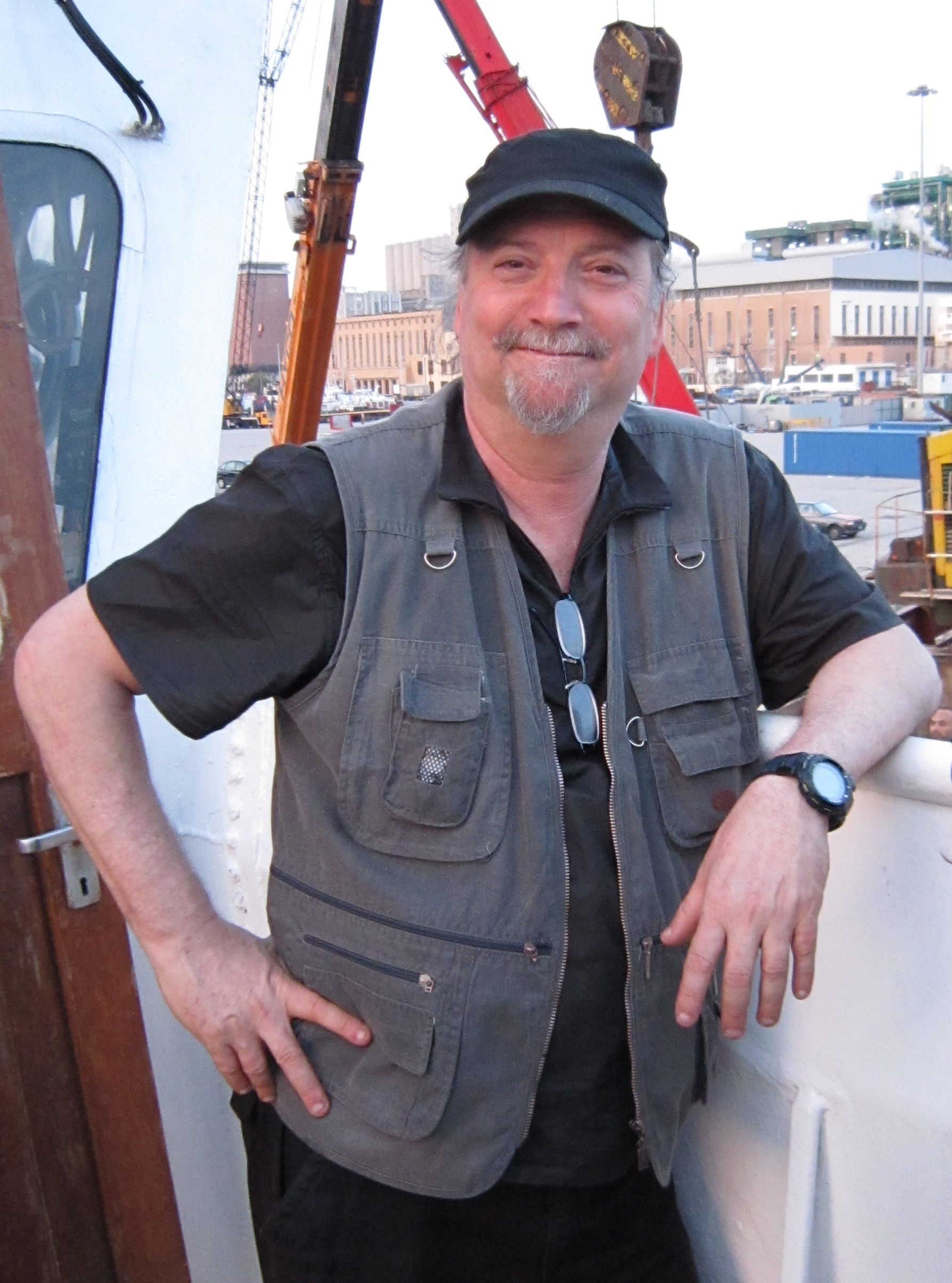
Dror Feiler onboard MS Sofia on 24 May 2010 on its way to the Gaza Strip

Dror Elimelech Feiler (Hebrew: דרור אלימלך פיילר; born 31 August 1951) is a Swedish musician, artist and left-wing activist. He is married to the artist Gunilla Sköld-Feiler.

== Early life and career ==
Feiler was born in Tel Aviv in 1951 to Eliezer and Pnina Feiler, and moved with his family to kibbutz Yad Hana in 1967. His father, Eliezer Feiler, was a left-wing activist. In 1978, he and others secretly met with a group of Palestine Liberation Organization representatives in Bucharest while it was still illegal. Eliezer Feiler was tried and eventually sentenced to six months of community service and a IL4,000 fine. The fine was paid, but the sentence was never served because, while the legal process was ongoing, the law had changed and it was no longer illegal to meet with members of the PLO. His mother, Pnina Feiler, born 1923, was among the founders of Yad Hana. She worked with mobile health centrals in Palestinian villages in the West Bank that have to travel far to get access to healthcare and other services until 2015, when she stopped due to her advanced age. Dror Feiler served as a paratrooper in the Israel Defense Forces.

Feiler left Israel in the early 70s to pursue his musical studies in Sweden, where he met his wife. Swedish law at that time did not recognize dual citizenship, and Feilor had to relinquish his Israeli citizenship in order to become a citizen of Sweden. He studied avant-garde music and its interpretation at the Fylkingen Institut for New Music from 1975 to 1977, musicology at Stockholm University from 1977 to 1978 and composition at the Royal College of Music, Stockholm from 1978 to 1983.

In January 2004 he and Gunilla Sköld-Feiler made international news with their art installation Snow White and The Madness of Truth, which referred to Palestinian female suicide bomber Hanadi Jaradat, which was vandalised by the then Israeli ambassador to Sweden Zvi Mazel. The installation consisted of a long pool of water coloured blood red, upon which floated a small white boat named "Snövit" ("Snow White") carrying a portrait of Hanadi Jaradat. She had blown herself up in October 2003 in an attack on Maxim's restaurant in the northern Israeli city of Haifa, killing 21 Jewish and Arab Israelis and injuring 51.

He runs the artspace TEGEN 2 in Stockholm together with Gunilla Sköld Feiler.

He is active as a composer of modern music, including pieces for symphonic orchestras, opera, chamber music and electro-acoustic music. In April 2008, the Bavarian Radio Symphony Orchestra dropped the world premiere of his composition Halat Hisar (State of Siege), after musicians complained that the music, which includes machine gun sounds, was so loud that it gave them ear problems and headaches.

On 31 May 2010 Feiler was aboard one of the ships involved in the Gaza flotilla raid and sustained some minor injuries to the face during the raid. For his participation in the raid, Feiler was banned from entering Israel for 10 years. In July 2010, he flew to Israel together with Swedish MP Mehmet Kaplan, who had also received a 10-year entry ban over his participation, planning to lodge a complaint with the Israel Police over the flotilla raid. They were refused entry at Ben Gurion Airport and deported. In 2011, Feiler was involved in the Freedom Flotilla II, and was among 15 activists arrested by Israeli authorities aboard the boat Dignité. He was subsequently deported from Israel.

In the 2010 Swedish general election, Feiler was a candidate for the Left Party (Swedish: Vänsterpartiet) in Stockholm. He obtained 1,784 personal preference votes in Stockholm Municipality (4.51% of the Left Party votes, the second most voted candidate on the list after party chairman Lars Ohly) and 629 personal preference votes in Stockholm County (1.99% of the Left Party votes).

== Attempts to visit his mother ==
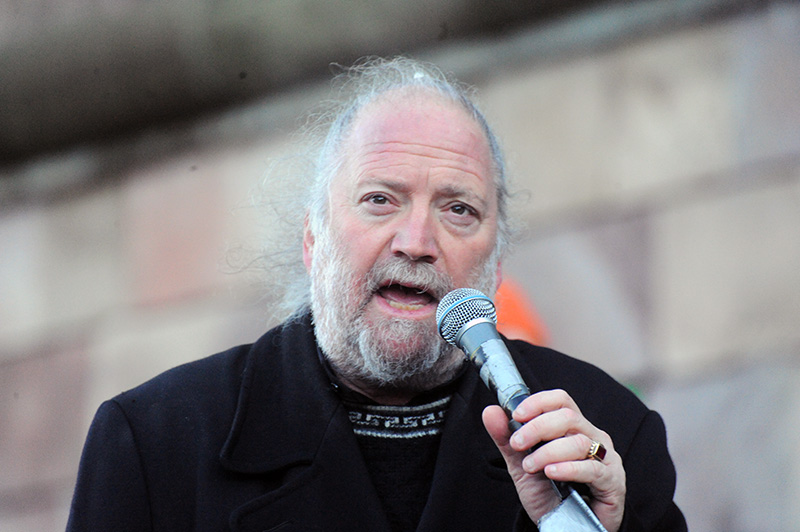
Feiler speaking in 2015

In 2013, Feiler appealed his ban from Israel in order to visit his ailing 90-year-old mother. His mother, then 90, had to fly to Sweden to meet up with her son, though subsequently, due to health problems, that option ceased to be available. She therefore repeatedly requested the Israeli Ministry for the Interior to lift his ban, without success. In 2018, after Swedish law dropped its ban on dual citizenship, Feiler asked for his citizenship to be restored on the basis of his right to make aliyah and be with his aging mother. No reply was forthcoming. In response to a petition by the family's attorney in December 2019, the director of the Population and Immigration Authority Prof. Shlomo Mor-Yosef in January 2020 conceded permission for a 2-week visit on condition he post a $28,910 bond. This condition was appealed and, in September, a judge extended his visa by a further 2 weeks, since, were he to visit, he would have to stay in quarantine for 14 days, given the COVID-19 crisis. That crisis had also affected Feiler's concert schedule, depriving him of adequate financial means to post the bond.

== Awards ==
- 2003 – The Rosenberg Award
- 2026 – Jan Myrdal's big prize – The Lenin Award
