= Nå er det nå! =

Norwegian children's television program

Nå er det nå! (English: Now is now!) is a Norwegian children's television program with Thomas Numme and Rebekka Karijord as the presenter. The series was first broadcast on NRK in 2000. Similar concepts exist in Denmark (NU er det NU), Sweden (Nu är det nu) and Finland (SanoNYT in Finnish and NU är NU in Swedish), which were created in collaboration with the Norwegian series.

The series' presenter plays a "crazy researcher" who lives in a crow castle, the Crow Castle. The first presenter for the series was Thomas Numme, while Rebekka Karijord took over the role in January 2001.

== Production ==
Nå er det nå! was produced during the summer of 1999 by the company Nordmagi, which is a Nordic collaboration that was created to prevent foreign cartoon giants from taking over children's television production. The collaboration meant that the four Nordic countries (In this context: Norway, Denmark, Sweden and Finland) create their own features which are shown in similar programs in all the countries involved. One of Sweden's features was the "Mini detectives" segment. Each country also has its own presenter.

The series was made for children between the ages of four and eight.

== Segments ==
- "Hundeplaneten" (English: Dog planet)
- "Minidetektivene" (English: The mini detectives)
- "Og Valdemar, Og Yrsa" (English: And Valdemar, And Yrsa)
- "Ørneredet" (English: The eagle's nest)
