= Songs of Earth =

2023 Norwegian documentary film

- TIFF poster
- Norwegian: Fedrelandet
- Literally: Fatherland
- Directed by: Margreth Olin
- Written by: Margreth Olin
- Starring: Margreth Olin; Jørgen Mykløen; Magnhild Mykløen
- Cinematography: Margreth Olin; Lars Erlend; Tubaas Øymo
- Edited by: Michal Leszczylowski
- Music by: Rebekka Karijord
- Production company: Speranza Film
- Distributed by: Norsk Film distribusjon
- Release dates: 18 March 2023 (CPH:DOX); 1 September 2023 (Norway)
- Running time: 90 minutes
- Country: Norway
- Language: Norwegian
- Box office: US$1,062,051

Songs of Earth (Norwegian: Fedrelandet) is a 2023 Norwegian documentary film written and directed by Margreth Olin. In the film, Olin follows her 85-year-old father through a year in the natural surroundings of Oldedalen in Vestland, where he grew up. The film had its world premiere during the documentary film festival CPH:DOX in Denmark on 18 March 2023, and a Norwegian cinema premiere on 1 September of the same year.

The film was selected as the Norwegian entry for the Best International Feature Film at the 96th Academy Awards. On December 7, it appeared in the eligible list for consideration for the 2024 Oscars, but didn't make the shortlist.

== Content ==
The film portrays Olin's existential journey with her own ageing parent in the backdrop of mountainous landscapes of Norway for a year. It is a cinematic work about life, death, nature and about simply being present in the world. Olin's parents' love and lifelong loyalty bear quiet witness to how surroundings and inner space resonate with each other.

== Production ==
The film production was supported by The Nordisk Film & TV Fond, the Oslo-based agency. It received fund of €59,000 in 2021.

== Release ==
In May 2023, the film competed at the Trento Film Festival and had its Italian premiere in Trento, Italy.

On 20 July 2023, the film was screened at the New Horizons Film Festival in Wrocław, Poland. In August 2023, it was screened at the Norwegian International Film Festival in the 'Human Nature' theme of the main programme, and at the 23rd edition of Dokufest, at Kosovo.

Songs of Earth was screened in TIFF Docs at the 2023 Toronto International Film Festival on 14 September 2023. It was also screened in the second week of October at the Hot Springs Documentary Film Festival and then, at the Hamptons International Film Festival for United States premiere. In the same month, on 19 October 2023, it was screened at the 14th La Roche-sur-Yon International Film Festival in Vendée, France.

The film was selected at the 65th edition of the Lübeck Nordic Film Days, and was screened on 3 November 2023 at Lübeck, Northern Germany. A week later, it was screened at the International Documentary Film Festival Amsterdam on 10 November 2023.

On 20 October, it was reported that Strand Releasing bought the rights of the film for North American distribution.

== Reception ==
On the review aggregator Rotten Tomatoes website, the film has an approval rating of 100% based on 16 reviews, with an average rating of 7.4/10.

Vladan Petkovic reviewing for Cineuropa highlighted that the film is so well made that "it puts the big-budget nature documentaries to shame with its visuals, music and sound." Concluding Lemercier wrote, "Even if the visuals, sound design and score are more impressive than in any big-budget nature documentary, it is the finely developed personal dimension that brings out the meaning and the message of the film, which is made all the more poignant by the carefully devised tone and balance in the directorial approach.".

Alissa Wilkinson writing in Vox Media gave positive review and wrote, "A remarkable, poetic meditation, Songs of Earth weaves the smallness of human lifespan into the grandness of the earth's history, and does it all with unspeakable beauty."

Wendy Ide in the review for ScreenDaily gave positive views and opined that Margreth Olin began "this lyrical, strikingly beautiful project, returning to her childhood home in Oldedalen, in Western Norway and accompanying her 84 year-old father" with a first-rate specialist team, of cinematographer, sound recordist and composer Rebekka Karijord; and "the result is an arresting study of this particularly photogenic corner of Norway which repays a big-screen viewing." Ide concluded, "Jorgen's [Olin's father] whole message is that we should not get so absorbed by concerns about the past – or indeed the future – that we lose our connection to the present."

== Accolades ==
Award	Date	Category	Recipient	Result	Ref.
Kraków Film Festival	21 June 2023	Samsung Excellence Line award for exceptional image quality	Songs of Earth	Won	
IDA Documentary Awards	12 December 2023	Best Cinematography	Lars Erlend, Tubaas Øymo	Nominated	
IDA Documentary Awards	12 December 2023	Best Original Music Score	Rebekka Karijord	Nominated	
Cinema Eye Honors	12 January 2024	Outstanding Production	Margreth Olin	Nominated	
Cinema Eye Honors	12 January 2024	Outstanding Cinematography	Lars Erlend, Tubaas Øymo	Nominated	
Cinema Eye Honors	12 January 2024	Outstanding Original Score	Rebekka Karijord	Nominated	

=== Listicle ===
Publisher	Year	Listicle	Placement	Ref.
Variety	2023	Winner's Circle at Doc NYC	Included	

== See also ==
- List of submissions to the 96th Academy Awards for Best International Feature Film
- List of Norwegian submissions for the Academy Award for Best International Feature Film
