= I Am Greta =

2020 Swedish documentary film

- Official release poster
- Directed by: Nathan Grossman
- Produced by: Fredrik Heinig; Cecilia Nessen
- Starring: Greta Thunberg
- Cinematography: Nathan Grossman
- Edited by: Charlotte Landelius; Hanna Lejonqvist
- Music by: Rebekka Karijord; Jon Ekstrand
- Production company: B-Reel Films
- Distributed by: Dogwoof; Filmwelt; Hulu; SVT; Triart
- Release dates: 3 September 2020 (Venice); 16 October 2020 (United Kingdom & Germany); 13 November 2020 (United States); 20 November 2020 (Sweden)
- Running time: 97 minutes
- Countries: Sweden; United Kingdom; United States; Germany
- Languages: English; Swedish
- Box office: $313,963

I Am Greta is a 2020 internationally co-produced documentary film directed by Nathan Grossman, following climate change activist Greta Thunberg. The film had its world premiere at the 77th Venice International Film Festival on 3 September 2020, and was released on Hulu on 13 November 2020.

== Production ==
In December 2019, it was announced Nathan Grossman would direct the film documenting Greta Thunberg, with Hulu distributing.

== Release ==
I Am Greta had its world premiere at the 77th Venice International Film Festival on 3 September 2020. It also screened at the Toronto International Film Festival on 11 September 2020 and at the Filmfest Hamburg on 3 October 2020. The film was released in the United Kingdom and Germany on 16 October 2020 by Dogwoof and Filmwelt. It was released in the United States on 13 November 2020.

== Reception ==
On the review aggregator Rotten Tomatoes, the film holds an approval rating of 79% based on 82 reviews, with an average rating of 7/10. The website's critics consensus reads, "Audiences might not learn anything new from I Am Greta, but its stirring chronicle of the young activist's efforts is inspiring." On Metacritic, the film has a weighted average score of 69 out of 100, based on 20 critics, indicating "generally favorable" reviews.
