= Charles Capps =

American television evangelist

- Born: January 4, 1934; Brummitt, Arkansas, U.S.
- Died: February 23, 2014 (aged 80); England, Arkansas, U.S.
- Occupations: Farmer, minister
- Organization: Capps Ministries
- Spouse: Peggy Capps
- Children: 2
- Parent: E.S Capps
- Website: charlescapps.com

Charles Emmitt Capps (January 4, 1934 – February 23, 2014) was an American Christian preacher and teacher in the Word of Faith movement.

During his lifetime, Capps had influenced the Word of Faith movement through various publications, as well as, directly in his role as a preacher.

== Biography ==
Charles Capps was born on January 4, 1934, to Emmet and Minnie Capps in Burmmitt, Arkansas. His family owned a farm, on which he lived as a child. Immediately after graduating from high-school, Capps followed this tradition and began farming in the Lonoke County area. By the age of seventeen, he could fly civilian aircraft and became a member of the "flying farmers".

In 1951, he was married to Peggy Capps, and by 1978, he had retired on being a farmer to pursue full-time ministry.

During his middle age, Capps enjoyed rising popularity as a preacher and religious figure, and often spoke at seminars and conventions. He has also appeared on the Believers Voice of Victory television program, hosted by Kenneth Copeland Ministries of Fort Worth, Texas. Eventually, he launched his own radio and TV broadcast program. In total, Capps eventually authored 24 books, of which nearly 6 million copies were sold during his lifetime. Much of his writing was also translated and published in multiple languages.

Capps died at his home on February 23, 2014.

== Bibliography ==
- End Time Events, Harrison House (1979) ISBN 0-89274-946-6
- Authority in Three Worlds, Harrison House (1980) ISBN 0-8927-4281-X
- The Tongue: A Creative Force, Harrison House (1995) ISBN 0-8927-4061-2
- Releasing The Ability of God Through Prayer, Capps Publishing (2004) ISBN 0-9820320-2-1
- "God's Creative Power" series. Capps Publishing (2004) ISBN 0-9820320-3-X
