= Hanadi Jaradat =

Palestinian suicide bomber (1975–2003)

- Born: Hanadi Tayseer Abdul Malek Jaradat; 22 September 1975; Jenin, West Bank
- Died: 4 October 2003 (aged 28); Haifa, Israel
- Cause of death: Suicide bombing
- Military career
- Allegiance: Islamic Jihad Movement in Palestine

Hanadi Tayseer Abdul Malek Jaradat (Arabic: هنادي تيسير عبدالمالك جرادات) (22 September 1975 – 4 October 2003) was a Palestinian suicide bomber from Jenin, who blew herself up on Saturday, 4 October 2003 in a suicide attack on Maxim restaurant, a Haifa restaurant co-owned by the same Jewish and Arab families for more than 40 years. She murdered 21 Jewish and Arab Israelis, and injured 51 other people. Among the dead were four children, including a two-month old infant, and five Arabs. She had been recruited by Islamic Jihad.

== Background ==
Jaradat was born on 22 September 1975 in the West Bank city of Jenin. At the time of her suicide bombing attack, she was a 28-year-old (12 days away from being a 29-year-old) law student due to qualify as a lawyer in a few weeks. She had studied law at Yarmouk University in Jordan.

Jaradat reportedly carried out the bombing in Haifa as an act of revenge after Israel Defense Forces undercover operatives in Jenin killed her cousin (Salah, 34) and her younger brother (Fadi, 25), both of whom were members of Islamic Jihad, with her cousin a senior member of the Al-Quds Brigades, in a clash. Earlier, when she was 21, her fiancé had been killed by Israeli security forces. Following the killing of her cousin and brother, Jaradat went into mourning and began to study the Koran and fast two days a week.

== Bombing ==
On the day of the bombing, Saturday, 4 October 2003, she traveled from Jenin in the West Bank to Haifa. She traveled to Maxim Restaurant, which The Guardian described as "a rare oasis of coexistence between Arabs and Jews." The 22-pound body-belt bomb that she wore around her waist in order to feign pregnancy included nails, screws, ball bearings, and metal fragments packed around the four-kilogram high explosive core to maximize its lethal effect.

Maxim is a beachfront restaurant co-owned by Jews and Arabs in the northern Israeli city of Haifa. 21 Jewish and Arab Israelis were killed and 51 others injured. The victims included four Israeli children (one of whom was a two-month old infant). Jaradat had intentionally paused near a group of baby carriages in the center of the crowded restaurant. According to Haifa police sources, the aftermath was gruesome, with some of the dead still sitting upright at their tables, while others, including children and babies, were slammed against the walls. Due to the force of the explosion, all that remained of Jaradat was her head. Two of the Arabs killed, Sherbel Matar (aged 23) and Hana Francis (aged 39) came from the village of Fasouta. Jaradat was the sixth female suicide bomber of the Second Intifada and the second who had been recruited by Islamic Jihad. Palestinian Islamic Jihad claimed responsibility for the bombing.

== Aftermath ==
Commenting on his daughter, her father Taisir, who had worked in Israel for years as a house painter, said "My daughter's action reflected the anger that every Palestinian feels at the occupation. The occupation did not have mercy on my son Fadi, her brother. They killed him even though he was not a wanted person, they murdered him in cold blood before Hanadi's eyes." He declined all condolences, instead saying that he was proud of what his daughter had done, and that "I will accept only congratulations for what she did. This was a gift she gave me, the homeland and the Palestinian people. Therefore, I am not crying for her. Even though the most precious thing has been taken from me."

In reprisal for the suicide bombing, Israeli forces conducted a raid at 3:00 a.m. on 5 October 2003, during the course of which they demolished the Jaradat family home and the houses of two of her neighbours.

Maxim was quickly rebuilt and reopened.

== Honors and awards ==
Jaradat was proclaimed by the Islamic Jihad as the "Bride of Haifa" to honor her "marriage to the soil of her homeland", an honor it previously reserved only to men. Within several days of the bombing, trophy cards with her picture, labelled "Hanadi the Bride of Haifa", were being handed out in Gaza.

In 2005, the Palestinian daily Al-Ayyam published a special supplement entitled "What Did Hanadi Say", consisting of poems honoring Jaradat and calling for Jihad.

In October 2012, the Palestine Committee of the Arab Lawyers Union "created the 'Martyr Hanadi Jaradat plaque of honor' ... [and] conveyed to the family of Martyr Jaradat the good wishes of the head of the Union, Mr. Omar Al-Zayn… and also emphasized the pride of the Arab Lawyers Union for what their daughter had done in defense of Palestine and the nation", according to an October 14, 2012 report in the Palestinian daily publication Al-Ayyam. The union has a membership of bar associations in 15 countries and 27 affiliated organizations.

== Artwork and incident in Sweden ==
Jaradat was the subject of Snow White and The Madness of Truth, a controversial item of installation art by Israeli-born Swedish composer and musician Dror Feiler, and his Swedish wife, artist Gunilla Sköld-Feiler. It consisted of a portrait of Jaradat floating on a small white boat named "Snövit" ("Snow White") in a long pool of blood red water. The artwork became the centre of controversy when the Israeli ambassador to Sweden, Zvi Mazel, vandalized the installation. After pushing some lightstands into the pool, causing a short-circuit and disabling the light, Mazel told Feiler that "This is not a work of art. This is an expression of hatred for the Israeli people. This has glorified suicide bombers". Further, he said to the press that the piece constituted a "complete legitimization of genocide, the murder of innocent people, innocent civilians, under the guise of culture". Feiler rejected charges that their intention was to glorify suicide bombers and accused Mazel of "practicing censorship". He said the installation was made to "call attention to how weak people left alone can be capable of horrible things". Following the incident, Mazel said: "I was standing before an exhibit calling for genocide, praising the genocide of me, you, my brothers and sisters."
