= Charles Farah =

Charles Farah, Jr. (July 21, 1926 – October 9, 2001) was a Professor of Theology and Historical Studies at Oral Roberts University. He taught at the school from 1967 to 1991 and from 1994 to 1995. He is known for his book, From the Pinnacle of the Temple, which suggested balancing biblical truths during the height of the Word of Faith movement. In the 1970s some proponents of this movement suggested that if one was not healed supernaturally by God that one did not have 'enough faith' or was 'in sin'. He complemented this perspective and refreshed the charismatic movement by pointing back to the doctrine of the sovereignty of God. Dr. Charles Farah, Jr. is best known for discipling world-wide leaders, such as Billy Joe Daugherty (Victory Christian Center), Jamie Buckingham (charismatic preacher and author), Terry Law (World Compassion founder), Larry Stockstill (Bethany World Prayer Center in Louisiana), and Keith Green (singer and songwriter). Farah received his M.A. from Wheaton College, B.D. from Fuller Seminary, and his doctorate from the University of Edinburgh.

== Bibliography ==
- Charles Farah, Jr. (1959). Catechism for New Christians. Moody Press.
- Charles Farah, Jr. (1979). From the Pinnacle of the Temple. Plainfield, N.J: Logos International. ISBN 0-88270-361-7.
