= Snow White and the Madness of Truth =

Artwork by Dror Feiler and Gunilla Sköld-Feiler

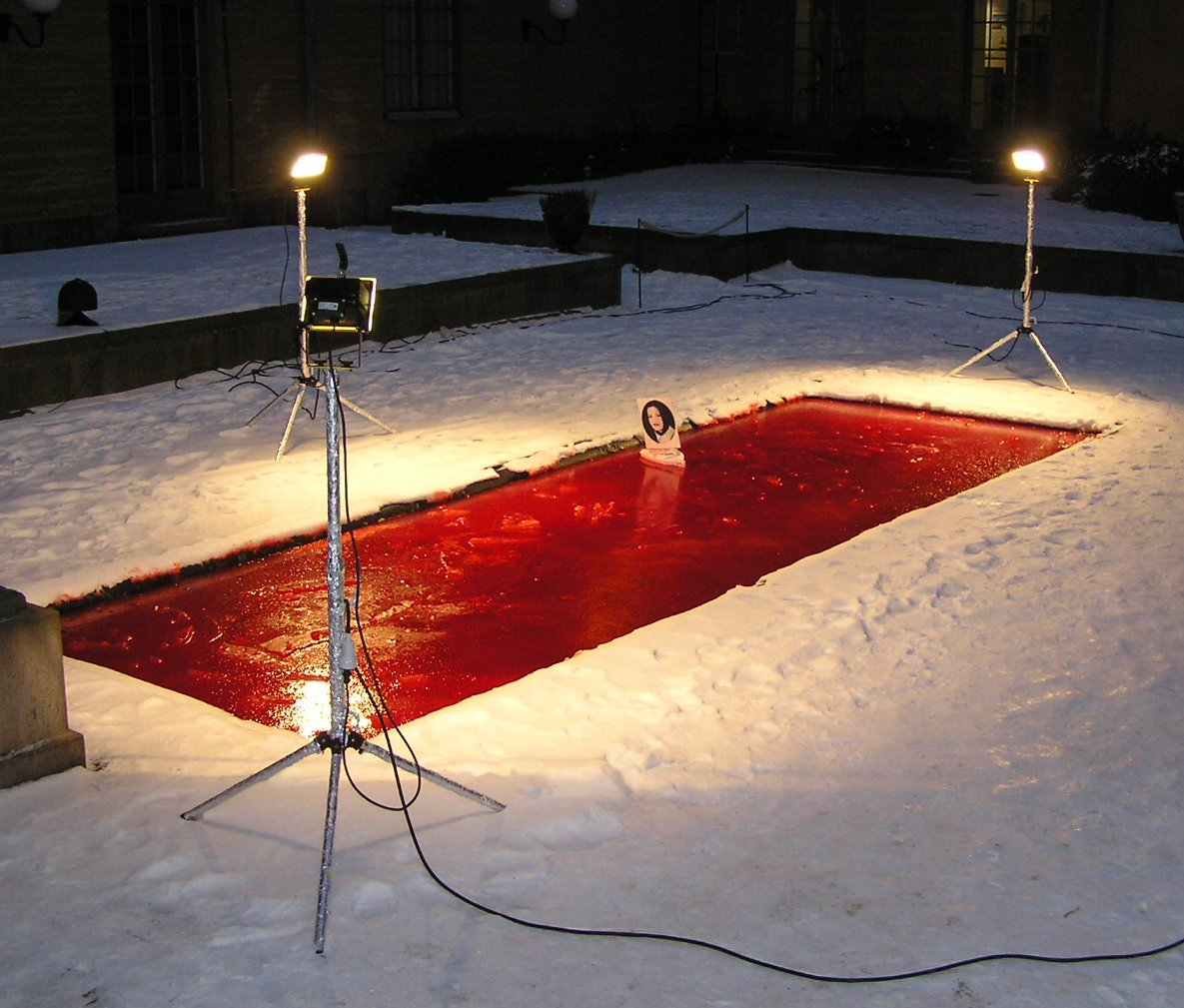
The installation Snow White and the Madness of Truth.

Snow White and the Madness of Truth (Swedish: Snövit och sanningens vansinne) was a 2004 item of installation art by Swedish, Israeli-born composer and musician Dror Feiler and his Swedish wife, artist Gunilla Sköld-Feiler. Feiler and Sköld-Feiler created the visuals and the music for the artwork together, which was installed in the Swedish History Museum in Stockholm, Sweden.

The installation consisted of a long pool of water coloured blood red, upon which floated a small white boat named "Snövit" ("Snow White") carrying a smiling portrait of Hanadi Jaradat, a Palestinian suicide bomber who killed 21 Jewish and Arab Israelis, and injured 51 more.

A text was written on the walls, and the sound of Bach's Mein Herze schwimmt im Blut (Cantata 199) played in the background. This piece begins with the words, "My heart swims in blood / because the brood of my sins / in God's holy eyes / makes me into a monster". According to the artists, the installation was made to "call attention to how weak people left alone can be capable of horrible things".

The artwork became the centre of some controversy when then Israeli ambassador to Sweden, Zvi Mazel, vandalized it, claiming that it "glorified suicide bombers" and was "an expression of hatred for the Israeli people." Journalist Sverker Lenas compared the reactions to those in the US about Steve Earle's song "John Walker's Blues", which appeared on his 2002 album Jerusalem. As an attempt to expose the moral panic resulting from the phenomenon of hasty misinterpretation followed by reactionary judgment, he explained:

Det går att jämföra "Snövit"-debatten med den amerikanska debatt som uppstod i spåren av Steve Earles "John Walker´s blues" på skivan "Jerusalem". I låten får vi se världen som den skulle kunna se ut genom "den amerikanska talibanens" ögon [...] Steve Earle av en nästan samstämmig amerikansk mediekör stämplad som antipatriot (ja, det var avsett som en beskyllning). Ändå tar Steve Earle ingenstans John Walkers parti. [...] Av samma anledning spelar det ingen roll att Dror och Gunilla Sköld Feiler säger sig "fördöma självmordsbombningar till 100 procent". Som den israeliska poeten Yitzhak Laor skriver i tidningen Haaretz bryter texten "mot ett israeliskt tabu som förbjuder oss att titta ordentligt på självmordsterroristernas ansikten".

[It is possible to compare the "Snow White" debate with the American debate that arose in the wake of Steve Earle's "John Walker's Blues" on the album Jerusalem. In the song we see the world as it could be through the eyes of the "American Taliban". [...] Steve Earle was labeled by an almost unanimous American media chorus as an anti-patriotic. Yet Steve Earle nowhere takes John Walker's side. [...] For the same reason, it doesn't matter that Dror and Gunilla Sköld Feiler say they "condemn suicide bombings 100 percent". As Israeli poet Yitzhak Laor writes in the newspaper Haaretz, the text "violates an Israeli taboo that forbids us from looking closely at the faces of suicide terrorists".]

== Reaction since the vandalism ==
In early 2004 the artwork briefly came to the attention of the international media after it was vandalized on January 16 by Zvi Mazel, the Israeli ambassador to Sweden. Mazel disconnected the electricity powering the installation and tipped one of its lights into the water, causing a short circuit. When Mazel was asked to leave he refused and had to be escorted out by museum security. The event was filmed by the museum's security cameras.

Mazel later gave contradicting statements about the event. To the Swedish media, he said it was done in the heat of the moment, but to Israeli media he said it was premeditated and that he had planned it even before he saw the artwork.

The installation was a part of the Making Differences exhibition at the Swedish History Museum. On January 18, 2004, Thomas Nordanstad, who was responsible for the exhibition, was attacked by an unidentified man who attempted to push Nordanstad down a staircase. Nordanstad had received over 400 e-mails containing various threats. Both Kristian Berg, head of the museum, and the artists also received many threats. The following Sunday, a museum guard had to remove a group of people who were throwing various objects into the water. On January 19, a Russian-Jewish artist floated another image in the pool, that of Mijailo Mijailovic, the murderer of Swedish foreign minister Anna Lindh. After the attack on Nordanstad the number of visitors to the museum increased to approximately 1,400 per day, up from roughly the same number per week.

According to Swedish Dagens Nyheter journalist Henrik Brors, there may have been hidden motives behind Mazel's act. He speculated that it may have been done in an effort to discredit Sweden and the European Union by depicting them as anti-Semites, and to have the EU back down from its peace efforts in the Middle East. In the analysis in Dagens Nyheter, Brors further speculated that Mazel may have done it to give Israel an excuse for not attending the international anti-genocide conference Stockholm International Forum that was to be held in Stockholm January 26–28.

The Young Christian Democrats, the youth organisation of the Swedish Christian Democratic party, reported the artwork to the police in hope that action could be taken pursuant to Sweden's strict laws against hate speech. Mazel himself asked in an interview, "If we Jews say that this offends us, why can't a government remove it?"

Stockholms Lokaltrafik decided to remove advertising of the Making Differences exhibit that used a picture of Hanadi Jaradat; those posters were a part of C. M. V. Hausswolff's artwork "God made me do it" and had nothing to do with Feiler/Sköld installation "Snow White and the Madness of Truth."

An e-mail protest organized by the Simon Wiesenthal Center was directed at Prime Minister Göran Persson's office. By the morning of January 27, 2004, 13,603 emails had been received. Kristian Berg stated, "I did not hear anyone who saw the work say that it was an anti-Semitic installation, against the Jewish people or against the Israeli people, I therefore think that this work was politically hijacked — the interpretation that Ambassador Mazel gave it was very narrow and very political."

As scheduled, the artwork was removed from display on February 8, 2004. In 2011 the Feilers created a new installation, Once upon a time in the middle of winter, based on the events.
