= Chockstone Pictures =

American independent film production company

- Industry: Independent Film
- Founded: 2004; 22 years ago
- Founder: Paula Mae Schwartz; Steve Schwartz
- Headquarters: Malibu, California, United States
- Website: chockstonepictures.com

Chockstone Pictures is an American independent film production company founded in 2004 by the husband-and-wife team of Steve and Paula Mae Schwartz. The company is headquartered in Malibu, California. The company's filmography includes The Road, The Tree of Life, Killing Them Softly, and All the Old Knives. Chockstone Pictures' founders also founded Schwartz Communications, a public relations agency.

== Filmography ==
| Year | Film | Ref. |
|---|---|---|
| 2009 | The Road | |
| 2011 | The Tree of Life | |
| 2012 | Killing Them Softly | |
| 2013 | The Host | |
| 2013 | The Counselor | |
| 2014 | Serena | |
| 2018 | Homeless: The Soundtrack | |
| 2022 | All the Old Knives | |
| 2025 | Anniversary | |
