= All the Old Knives =

2022 American thriller film

- Official release poster
- Directed by: Janus Metz Pedersen
- Screenplay by: Olen Steinhauer
- Based on: All the Old Knives by Olen Steinhauer
- Produced by: Mark Gordon; Steve Schwartz; Paula Mae Schwartz; Nick Wechsler; Matt Jackson
- Starring: Chris Pine; Thandiwe Newton; Laurence Fishburne; Jonathan Pryce
- Cinematography: Charlotte Bruus Christensen
- Edited by: Mark Eckersley; Per Sandholt
- Music by: Jon Ekstrand; Rebekka Karijord
- Production companies: Entertainment One; Chockstone Pictures; Big Indie Pictures; Potboiler Productions; Jackson Pictures
- Distributed by: Amazon Studios
- Release date: April 8, 2022
- Running time: 101 minutes
- Country: United States
- Language: English

All the Old Knives is a 2022 American spy thriller film directed by Janus Metz Pedersen and written by Olen Steinhauer, based on Steinhauer's 2015 novel. The film stars Chris Pine, Thandiwe Newton, Laurence Fishburne, Jonathan Pryce and David Dawson.

The film was released by Amazon Studios in limited theaters across the United States, and on Amazon Prime Video, on April 8, 2022.

== Plot ==
In early 2020, CIA officer Henry Pelham is informed by his boss, Vick Wallinger, that the CIA has reopened the case of Turkish Alliance 127, a 2012 terrorist hijacking which ended in tragedy. Headquarters suspects there was a leak from the Vienna station, where Henry and Vick work. Henry is sent to interview Celia Harrison, who also worked at the Vienna station at the time of the hijacking. Henry and Celia were lovers, but she left him shortly after the event.

Celia, now retired, lives in Carmel-by-the-Sea, California with her family. Henry meets her at an upscale restaurant, which is almost empty of customers and staff. As Henry and Celia talk, she reveals that an Austrian intelligence agent named Karl Stein approached her shortly after she moved to Carmel. He wanted her to inform on her coworkers, but she refused. Henry has Celia recall the events of the hijacking.

In a flashback to 2012, Flight 127 is on the runway when it is hijacked by four armed militants belonging to an Islamist terrorist group. The Vienna station jumps into action to address the crisis and learns that Ilyas Shushani, a Chechen and former informant for Henry, may be involved. The hijackers threaten to kill the passengers unless several of their comrades are released from custody. Ahmed, a CIA courier who happened to be on the plane, contacts the CIA and suggests an attack via the plane's undercarriage. Celia connects with a possible source named Mohammed, but the meeting seems to yield nothing of value. Henry tells Celia and her mentor, Bill Compton, that when Henry worked in Moscow his superiors forced him to betray Ilyas to the Russian government as a trade-off for intel on an imminent attack on a U.S. embassy.

The Vienna station receives another message from Ahmed saying that the terrorists have a camera mounted on the plane's undercarriage and the assault should be called off. Celia notices differences in the language of Ahmed's messages and fears he has been compromised. Checking the station's phone logs, she notices that a call to Iran was placed from Bill's office phone. Then Ahmed is killed and thrown off the plane. The next day, Celia leaves both Henry and Vienna.

In the present, Henry asks why she ended their relationship so abruptly. Celia reveals that she saw a call on Henry's cellphone from the same Iranian number that she had found in the station phone logs. It is revealed that when the terrorists' demands were not met, they released sarin gas, killing themselves, the crew, and all passengers. The Vienna station is devastated by the outcome. Realizing that Henry was the leak, she left him but did not divulge her discovery to the CIA.

She further confesses that she recently shared her doubts with Karl Stein and that, after Henry contacted her to arrange this meeting, she agreed to help murder Henry. Karl arranged the fake staff, fake customers, and the poison in Henry's wine, while Vick arranged the fake assignment to place Henry in Celia's trap.

With Henry now aware that he is dying, Celia tearfully asks why he helped the terrorists. He explains that he was lured into a meeting with Ilyas, who had become radicalized and masterminded the hijacking. Ilyas staged the meeting between Mohammed and Celia, then let Henry know that she would die if Henry did not reveal how the authorities were planning to deal with the highjacking; Henry revealed the intended undercarriage assault, and that Ahmed was on the plane.

Celia tells him that the CIA already knew he was the leak. Ilyas was captured and gave him up – her decision to rat him out was confirmation.

Henry comes to terms with his impending death, and Celia returns home to her husband and children. Karl calls Vick to report that Henry has died, and Vick is shown in Henry's apartment while agents clear it out, revealing that they had been working together the entire time.

== Cast ==
- Chris Pine as Henry Pelham
- Thandiwe Newton as Celia Harrison
- Laurence Fishburne as Vick Wallinger
- Jonathan Pryce as Bill Compton
- Corey Johnson as Karl Stein
- Jonjo O'Neill as Ernst Pul
- Ahd Kamel as Leila Maroof
- David Dawson as Owen Lassiter
- Nasser Memarzia as Mohammed Dudayev
- Orli Shuka as Ilyas Shishani

== Production ==
The film was announced in May 2017, with Chris Pine and Michelle Williams in negotiations to star. James Marsh was set to direct, with The Mark Gordon Company and Entertainment One financing.

In September 2020, with Williams, Marsh and The Mark Gordon Company no longer involved with the film, Thandiwe Newton was cast to replace Williams and Janus Metz Pedersen was hired as director. In November 2020, Jonathan Pryce and Laurence Fishburne joined the cast.

Metz revealed filming had begun by December 2020 in London. Filming wrapped in London in February and moved to Monterey and Carmel-by-the-Sea, California, in March. Metz revealed that principal filming wrapped in mid-March.

Jon Ekstrand and Rebekka Karijord composed the film score.

== Release and reception ==
The film was released in limited theaters and on streaming on Amazon Prime Video on April 8, 2022.

=== Critical response ===
On the review aggregator website Rotten Tomatoes, 63% of 122 critics' reviews are positive, with an average rating of 6.2/10. The website's consensus reads: "All the Old Knives suffers in comparison to the dialogue-driven spy thrillers of the past, but the chemistry between its stars simmers even when the story doesn't." Metacritic, which uses a weighted average, assigned the film a score of 62 out of 100, based on 32 critics, indicating "generally favorable" reviews.

=== Audience viewership ===
According to Samba TV, All the Old Knives was watched by 637,000 US households in its first weekend streaming on Prime Video.
