= Knutby =

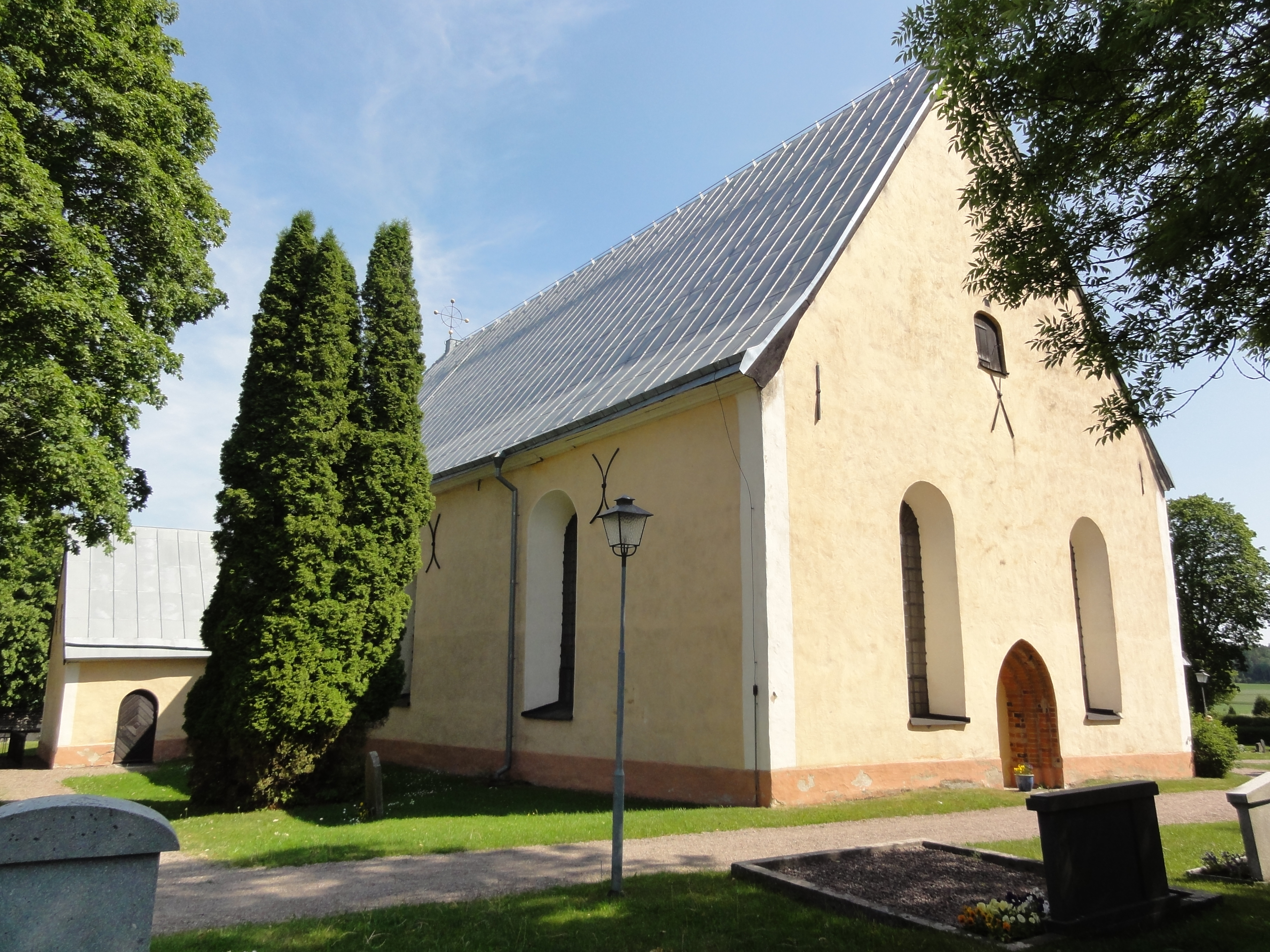
- Knutby Church

- Location within Uppsala Location within Sweden
- Coordinates: 59°54′35″N 18°15′55″E
- Country: Sweden
- Province: Uppland
- County: Uppsala County
- Municipality: Uppsala Municipality

Area
  - Total: 0.55 km^{2} (0.21 sq mi)

Population (31 December 2020)
  - Total: 692
  - Density: 1,300/km^{2} (3,300/sq mi)
- Time zone: UTC+1 (CET)
  - Summer (DST): UTC+2 (CEST)

Knutby is a locality situated in Uppsala Municipality, Uppsala County, Sweden, with 564 inhabitants in 2010.

Knutby's sports club, Knutby IF, was established in 1938 and its activities include football, skiing, gymnastics and athletics.

In 2004, Helge Fossmo, a pastor in a local Pentecostal church, orchestrated the murders of his wife and his neighbor in a case that garnered widespread media attention across Sweden.

== See also ==
- Knutby murder
