= Word of Faith Ministries =

Word of Faith Ministries is a Christian group that is part of the Word of Faith movement. It has been active in Nigeria since the 1980s. Their teachings include the prosperity gospel. Its founder is Dr. N. George Utuk. He is from Nigeria, but lives in the United States.
