= Waldau (surname) =

Waldau is a surname. Notable people with the surname include:

- Åsa Waldau (born 1965), Swedish religious leader
- Harry Waldau (1876–1943), German musician
- Max Waldau (1825–1855), German poet and writer
- Nikolaj Coster-Waldau (born 1970), Danish actor
- Nukâka Coster-Waldau (born 1971), Greenlandic singer and actress
- Paul Waldau, American academic
