= E. W. Kenyon =

American Christian pastor (1867–1948)

Essek William Kenyon (1867–1948) was a pastor of the New Covenant Baptist Church and founder and president of Bethel Bible Institute in Spencer, Massachusetts.

== Biography ==
Kenyon was born on April 25, 1867, in Hadley, New York. At age 17, he was converted in a Methodist prayer meeting. He became a church member in his early twenties and gave his first sermon at the Methodist Church of Amsterdam, New York, where he served as a deacon. Kenyon had a crisis of faith and left the faith for 2 1/2 years prior returning to faith in 1893.

Although desiring to be an actor, Kenyon earned a living as a piano and organ salesperson. In an attempt to hone his acting skills, Kenyon attended the Emerson School of Oratory in Boston for one year in 1892 studying acting.

Kenyon first married Evva Spurling. The two were married on May 8, 1893. Shortly afterward, Kenyon attended the services of Clarendon Street Baptist Church led by pastor Adoniram Judson (A.J.) Gordon. At this service, Kenyon and his wife rededicated their lives to Christianity.

Later that year, Kenyon joined the Free Will Baptists and became a pastor at a small church in Elmira, New York. In 1898, Kenyon opened Bethel Bible Institute in Spencer, Massachusetts, which remained in operation until 1923. He was its president for twenty-five years.

The school later moved to Providence, Rhode Island, and became Providence Bible Institute. It later became Barrington College and merged with Gordon College, which was named after one of Kenyon's many mentors, A. J. Gordon. It is now known as Gordon College.

Evva Kenyon died in 1914. Subsequently, Kenyon married Alice M. Whitney and had a son and a daughter with her. In 1948, E. W. Kenyon died, and his daughter Ruth, with whom he was living, continued on with his publishing ministry.

== "Positive confession" and New Thought Controversy ==
It has been suggested by some that Kenyon was the originator of the modern "positive confession" theology which is prevalent in Word of Faith Charismatic movement. Proponents of this view suggest that Kenyon's religious views were heavily influenced by the New Thought Movement during his time at the Emerson School, and that he developed the teaching of positive confession from that influence.

According to Kenyon biographer Joe McIntyre, the actual influence Kenyon's time at Emerson had on his religious views is debatable. Instead, McIntyre suggests that Kenyon developed his positive confession teaching primarily from the teachings of Holiness Movement, Faith Cure and Higher Life movement ministers of the late 19th Century.

Evidence that the teaching of positive confession was already developing in Christianity before Kenyon is present in time period literature. In the 1884 book The Atonement for Sin and Sickness, Russell Kelso Carter demonstrates an early version of what Kenyon later taught: "I only prayed, O, Lord, make me sure of the truth, and I will confess it; I have nothing to do with consequences; that is Thy part," and again, "Jesus has the keeping part, I have the believing and confessing."

According to Milmon F. Harrison, Kenneth E. Hagin, who was once thought to be the founder of Word of Faith Movement, is no longer considered to be the founder or main source of its ideas. Harrison discusses the similarities between the writings of the two which included entire passages and resulted in critics arguing that Hagin plagiarised Kenyon.

== Works ==
- The Father and His Family: The Story of Man's Redemption (1916)
- The Wonderful Name of Jesus (1927)
- Kenyon's Living Poems (1935)
- Signposts on the Road to Success (1938)
- The Two Kinds of Knowledge (1938)
- Jesus the Healer (1940)
- Identification: A Romance in Redemption (1941)
- New Kind of Love (1942)
- The Two Kinds of Faith (1942)
- The Two Kinds of Righteousness (1942)
- The Two Kinds of Life (1943)
- In His Presence: The Secret of Prayer (1944)
- New Creation Realities (1945)
- What Happened: From the Cross to the Throne (1945)
- The Blood Covenant (1949)
- The Hidden Man: The New Self: An Unveiling of the Unconscious Mind (1951)
- Basic Bible Course: The Bible in the Light of our Redemption (1969)
- Advanced Bible Course: Studies in the Deeper Life (1970)
- Personal Evangelism Course (2012)
- What We are in Christ (2013) Compiled and Edited by Joe McIntyre

Reprints:

- A New Type of Christianity (CrossReach Publications, 2016)
- Claiming Our Rights (CrossReach Publications, 2015)
