= Complete Mountain Almanac =

Studio album by Complete Mountain Almanac
- Released: January 27, 2023
- Studio: Studio Saint Germain, Paris, France
- Genre: Americana; baroque folk
- Length: 46:33
- Language: English
- Label: Bella Union
- Producer: Aaron Dessner; Bryce Dessner; Rebekka Karijord

Complete Mountain Almanac is the 2023 debut album by Complete Mountain Almanac, an Americana supergroup. The concept album, built around each song telling the story of a month, has garnered critical praise.

== Reception ==
According to the review aggregator Metacritic, Complete Mountain Almanac received "universal acclaim" based on a weighted average score of 84 out of 100 from seven critic scores. Editors at AllMusic rated this album 4 out of 5 stars, with critic Timothy Monger writing this "is a deeply nuanced record of layers and unseen details that only reveal themselves with time". In Loud and Quiet, Tristan Gatward rated this album an 8 out of 10, calling it "a means of greeting even the smallest, most passing experience with importance", with "humanity", a "commitment to uncertainty" and music that "never falls into melodrama", as a "testament to its creators". Mojo's Keiron Tyler called this release "delicate yet powerful, and utterly compelling" and gave it 4 out of 5 stars. At musicOMH, Ben Hogwood scored this release 4.5 out of 5 stars, writing that "the album has a rarefied beauty, a gentle but marked intensity, that makes itself immediately known to the listener". Writing for No Ripcord, David Coleman rated this release an 8 out of 10, exhorting readers to listen with headphones, as this is "a superficially pretty album, but you’ll need to afford it your full attention to unearth its full charms and appreciate its emotional depth". At Sputnikmusic, Sunnyvale gave Complete Mountain Almanac 4.3 out of 5 cautioning that it "probably isn’t a release with the greatest possible appeal across a broad swath of listeners" due to its genre's nicheness and "not-so-vague “hippie” vibes which will repel a certain type of music fan". Nigel Williamson of Uncut gave this album an 8 out of 10, calling it "an intense juxtaposition of the intimate and the universal framed in beguiling chamber-folk arrangements". Editors at AllMusic included this on their list of favorite folk and Americana albums of 2023.

== Track listing ==
All music written by Rebekka Karijord and all lyrics by Jessica Dessner.

1. "January" – 4:33
2. "February" – 5:10
3. "March" – 3:03
4. "April" – 4:01
5. "May" – 3:59
6. "June" – 5:07
7. "July" – 2:40
8. "August" – 3:43
9. "September" – 4:34
10. "October" – 3:03
11. "November" – 3:18
12. "December" – 3:22

== Personnel ==
Complete Mountain Almanac

- Jessica Dessner – artwork
- Rebekka Karijord – keyboards, vocals, programming, production

Additional personnel

- Pauline DeLassus – vocals
- Aaron Dessner – bass guitar, guitar, keyboards, programming, mixing at Long Pond, production
- Bryce Dessner – guitar, piano, string arrangement, production
- Jon Ekstrand – synthesizer
- Maria Holmstrom – vocals
- Luke Jarvis – layout design
- Joe Lambert – mastering
- Benjamin Lanz – horn
- Baptiste Leroy – assistant engineering
- Jon Low – mixing
- Bastien Lozier – engineering
- Malmö Symphony Orchestra – orchestra
- Jonas Nydesjo – conducting

== See also ==
- 2023 in American music
- List of 2023 albums
