= My Mercury =

- Film poster
- Directed by: Joëlle Chesselet
- Written by: Joëlle Chesselet
- Produced by: Joëlle Chesselet; George Chignell
- Cinematography: Lloyd Ross
- Edited by: Jinx Godfrey; Daniel Lapira
- Music by: Rebekka Karijord
- Production companies: A24; Dog Star Films
- Distributed by: A24
- Release date: January 12, 2024
- Running time: 97 minutes
- Countries: United Kingdom; United States
- Language: English

My Mercury is a 2024 documentary film directed, written, and produced by Joëlle Chesselet. The film follows then-28-year-old conservationist Yves Chesselet, who sheds the comforts of modern living to relocate to the remote Mercury Island off the coast of Namibia.

The film was released on January 12, 2024.

== Synopsis ==
Then-28-year-old conservationist Yves Chesselet, who sheds the comforts of modern living to relocate to the remote Mercury Island off the coast of Namibia. Chesselet is determined to bring 15,000 seals off the island and have Mercury Island solely be home to the critically endangered seabirds of the South Atlantic.

== Release ==
The film was released on Prime Video in the United States on January 12, 2024, by A24. The film was showcased at the Mumbai International Film Festival on June 17, 2024.
