= Ulf Ekman =

Swedish pastor

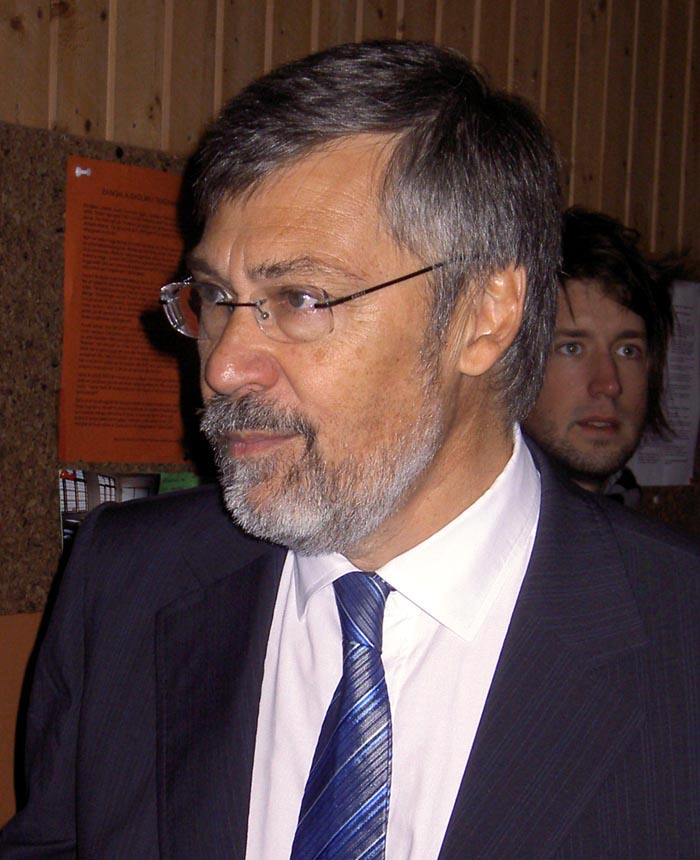
- Ekman in 2006
- Born: 8 December 1950 (age 75); Gothenburg, Sweden
- Education: Uppsala University
- Occupation: Former pastor
- Spouse: Birgitta Ekman (née Nilsson)
- Children: Aron, Jonathan Ekman, Samuel, Benjamin

Ulf Ekman (born 8 December 1950) is a former charismatic pastor and the founder of the Livets Ord (Word of Life) organization in Sweden, which brought the Word of Faith movement to that country. Ekman is now a Catholic. Ekman is married to Birgitta Ekman and has four sons: Aron, Jonathan Ekman, Samuel, and Benjamin.

== Ministry ==
In his youth, Ekman was a left-leaning atheist and sympathiser of Swedish Communist party KFML(r) before becoming a Christian before graduating from high school in 1970. He studied ethnography, history and theology at Uppsala University and in January 1979 was ordained in the Church of Sweden, returning to Uppsala University to work as the chaplain for several years. He studied for a year at Rhema Bible Training Center in Tulsa, Oklahoma, United States and upon his return to Uppsala in 1983 founded the Charismatic Evangelist church Livets Ord. He remained pastor of the church until passing on the pastorship to Robert Ekh in 2002 to focus on international work, though he later took up the position again. He also founded Livets Ord University and Word of Life Bible School.

Through his church he has sent missionaries to Bangladesh, Russia, Ukraine, Armenia, Azerbaijan, Tajikistan, Afghanistan, Albania, Israel and India. Word of Life is also the host for the annual Christian event "Europe Conference." In the former USSR he started to preach in Pentecostal churches and in stadiums. In Riga, Latvia he worked closely with Aleksey Ledyayev and the "New Generation Church" where he is a pastor. In almost every big city of the former USSR a Word of Life Church and a New Generation Church was established. The number of people reached with the Gospel can be estimated to be between 250,000 and 500,000 people. Cooperation with New Generation Church ended in March 2004 in doctrinal disagreement.

In the charismatic world, Ulf Ekman is considered to be a mentor, a spiritual father, and a pastor of pastors. Reverend Kong Hee has once claimed Ulf Ekman to be one of his mentors, and over the years they have developed a close relationship.

== Conversion ==
During his Sunday service on 3 March 2013, Ekman informed the assembly of a major change – he, its founder and its pastor for 30 years, would resign in May and be succeeded by Joakim Lundqvist, the up-to-then youth pastor of the congregation.

On 9 March 2014, Ekman announced his and his wife's leaving Livets Ord with the intent of joining the Catholic Church. The couple described the split as mainly amicable, and Ekman explained their decision in a lengthy sermon, citing Saint Paul's appeal in Jesus' name, in 1 Corinthians 1:10, for unity among Christians, as well as growing and more enthusiastic theological closeness to Catholic doctrine – including during a lengthy stay in Israel, where the couple took up residence in the early 2000s – as the main reasons. Earlier harsh condemnation of the Catholic Church made the decision controversial both among the Christian community and in national debate, where Ekman's firebrand image had been debated for decades.

He indicated, that he received a confirming word of prophecy ahead of his decision from a pastor that just had attended Kenneth Copeland's Charismatic Evangelical Leadership Conference in February 2014, a Conference to which Pope Francis sent a video message through Tony Palmer.

== Theology ==
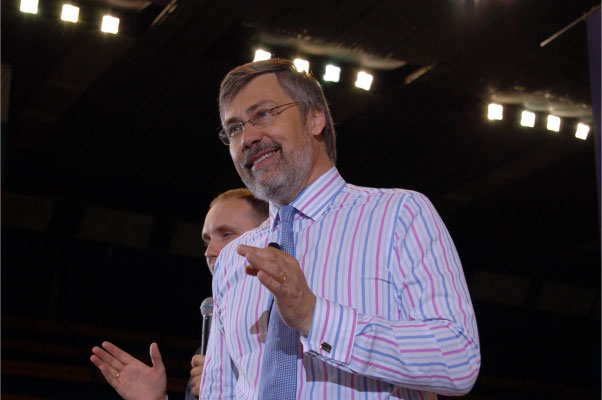
Ekman in 2006

Like many new Christian movements, Word of Life has been criticized by other Christians, but in particular by the media. Many critics claim that Word of Life's teachings about health and economic abundance created a survival of the fittest attitude, in opposition to the Christian ascetic ideal of being poor and humble. Ekman and Word of Life always responded to this criticism by saying that they strongly believed in God's promises in the Bible. Ekman claimed that a false image was created in the Swedish media on Word of Life as being against, for example, disabled persons, when the outspoken message was that God promises deliverance from sickness.

Ekman's theology, along with other representatives of the Word of Faith movement, was criticized for having gnostic elements. A thesis written by Kent Gunnarsson at Umeå University, published in 2004, had this claim. The opponent at the dissertation, Professor Alexander Radler, criticized Gunnarsson for a too-wide definition of Gnosticism. Radler appreciated Gunnarsson's thesis for its rich information about modern Gnosticism, but thought that Ekman's teachings could not be seen as gnostic. Ekman's own attitude against Gnosticism is negative.

Later on, Ekman rarely preached the typical Word of Faith teachings. He partially criticized some of them (for example, the Jesus Died Spiritually doctrine), but also wrote and said that the ground for his preaching was the revelation in the Bible he got from first listening to teachers like Kenneth Copeland and later studying at Kenneth Hagin's school in Tulsa.

Ekman seems to have broadened his doctrinal horizons with studies in patristic and church history. He has now an ecumenical approach to other congregations. In 2006 the bishop of the Catholic Diocese of Stockholm, Anders Arborelius, was invited to Word of Life church in Uppsala for a public discussion. Through the Livets Ord University, which is a branch of the Oral Roberts University, Ekman published a theological magazine called Keryx, containing articles from a broad, classical Christian point of view. This magazine had articles from different Christian traditions and excerpts from patristic writings. But a critical analysis of the Word of Faith movement's own teachings hasn't been published to this day.

In 2014, Ekman and his family converted to Catholicism. He claims that the Catechism of the Catholic Church is "the best book he has ever read".

In his 2015 book Den stora upptäckten. Vår väg till katolska kyrkan, he claims that an important factor in his conversion to Catholicism was information about Međugorje in Herzegovina and subsequent visit to the place, where Ulf and Birgitta met with Franciscan Jozo Zovko.

== Criticism ==
In November 2015, Ekman was criticized in a television episode of Uppdrag granskning, notably for his demand to be paid in cash when speaking in churches, a culture of silence refusing any criticism and his insistence on multiple offerings, in addition to the tithe.

== See also ==
- Livets Ord
