= Arab Lawyers Union =

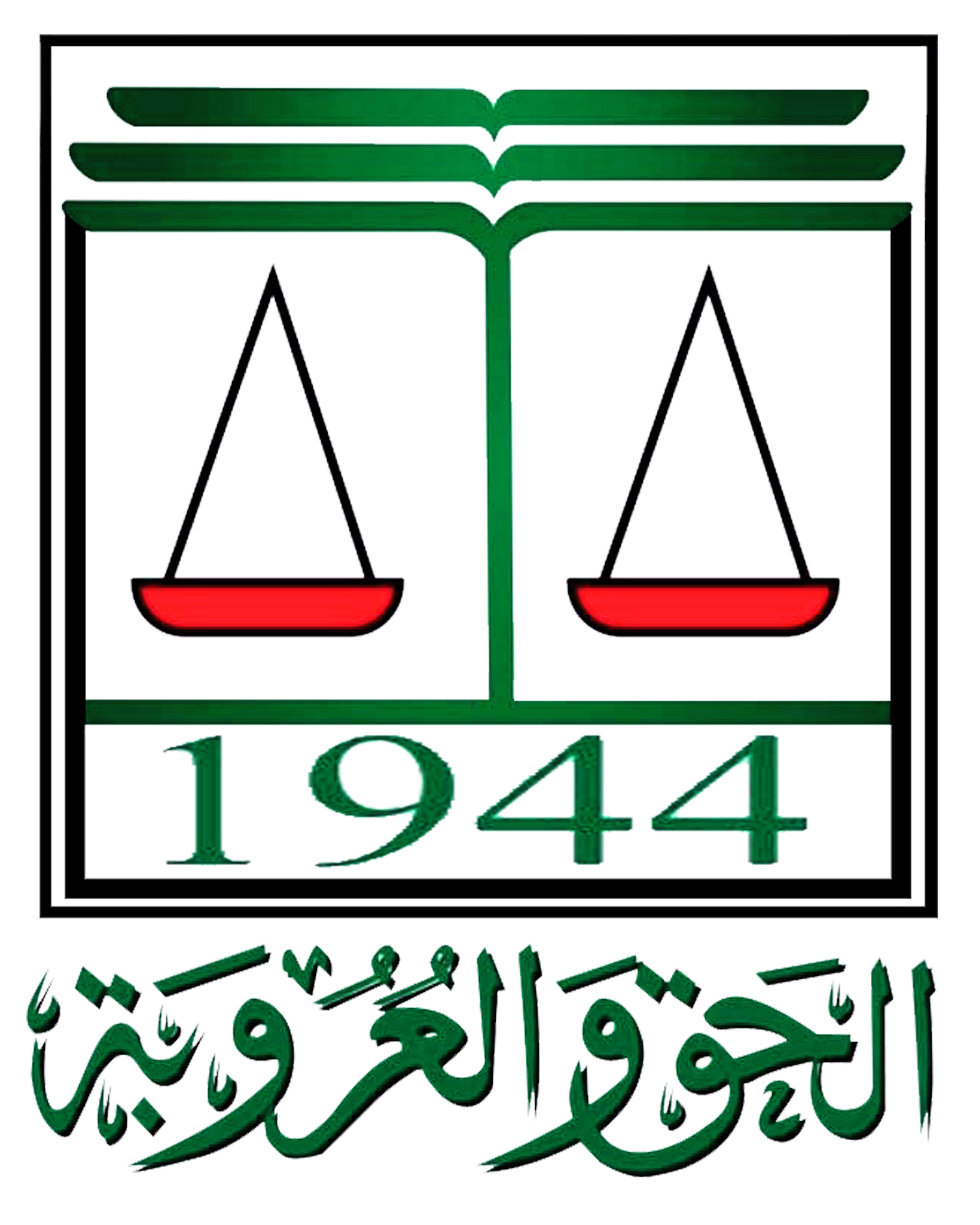
- Formation: 1944
- Founder: Abdul Hamid Badawi Pasha, Tawfiq al-Hakim, Muhammad Ali Jouhari
- Type: Professional association
- Headquarters: Cairo, Egypt
- Location: Arab world
- Members: Lawyers

The Arab Lawyers Union (ALU; Arabic: اتحاد المحامين العرب) is a professional association of lawyers from across the Arab world. Founded in 1944, the ALU seeks to promote the legal profession in the Arab world and to defend the rights of Arabs.

== History ==
The Arab Lawyers Union was founded in Cairo, Egypt, in 1944 by a group of Arab lawyers, including Tawfiq al-Hakim. The union was created in response to the growing need for a professional association of lawyers that could represent the interests of Arab lawyers and their clients in the face of colonialism and foreign domination in the Arab world.

In 2001, the Arab Lawyers Union distributed a book whose cover bore a swastika and the Star of David interconnected, at the World Conference against Racism 2001.

In March 2004, the Arab Lawyers Union formed a "defence committee" for former president Saddam Hussein and other Iraqi prisoners.

In October 2012, the Arab Lawyers Union presented their top award to suicide bomber Hanadi Jaradat who in 2003 killed 21 Jewish and Arab Israelis, and sent a delegation to her family to present them with the award. Ayman Abu Eisheh, a member of the Palestine Committee at the Arab Lawyers Union, said that the ALU were proud of Jaradat, and that her suicide bombing was "in defense of Palestine and the Arab nation."

Over the years, the Arab Lawyers Union has grown in size, and today it is one of the largest professional associations of lawyers in the Arab world. It is headquartered in Cairo, and has branches and affiliated organizations in a number of Arab countries, including Algeria, Bahrain, Jordan, Lebanon, Morocco, Palestine, Qatar, Saudi Arabia, Syria, Tunisia, and Yemen.

== Leadership and Governance ==
The Arab Lawyers Union is governed by a General Assembly, which meets every three years to elect a President and other officers, review the union's activities and policies, and set the agenda for the next three years.
