= Rebekka Karijord =

Norwegian musician and composer

- Born: 1976 (age 49–50); Sandnessjøen
- Occupations: Musician, composer
- Website: rebekkakarijord.com

Rebekka Karijord (born 1976 in Sandnessjøen) is a Norwegian-born musician and composer based in Stockholm, Sweden. Karijord has released a number of albums and composed soundtracks for several films, including I Am Greta, All the Old Knives, and Songs of Earth.

== Biography ==
Karijord holds a degree from the Stockholm University of the Arts, where she honed her voice as an actor, playwright and musician. Over the course of her career she has composed music for over 30 films, modern dance performances and theatrical pieces, as well as released six solo albums under her own name. Karijord recorded the solo record The Noble Art of Letting Go in 2009. It was released in Scandinavia in the Fall of 2009 and Europe in 2010. There were also song placements on BBC and ABC Television, and the world touring nouveau cirque Cirkus Cirkör performance Wear it Like a Crown being based upon Karijord's song of the same title.

In between composing projects, Karijord wrote and recorded We Become Ourselves in 2012, releasing it across Europe and UK in the late Fall of 2012 and early winter 2013. The record was selected as Mojo Magazines record of the month under the category world in November 2012 as well as top 10 records of 2012. Several European tours followed the release of We Become Ourselves. In January 2014 Karijord released Music for Film and Theatre, a largely instrumental compilation of songs that she composed under the years 2009–2013 for film and theatre projects. Her 2017 release, Mother Tongue, was positively reviewed in the Irish Times as showcasing "an artist whose creative expressiveness is in keeping with her instinctive role as a sensible communicator". Scandinavian and European touring followed the release of Mother Tongue. After multiple soundtrack releases, Karijord's next artist release was 2023's Complete Mountain Almanac, a collaboration with Bryce Dessner and Aaron Dessner of The National based upon the poems of Jessica Dessner with songs by Karijord. The record was released on Bella Union to critical acclaim as outlined in Mojo Magazine review hailing “A potent rumination on climate change and personal circumstances... Complete Mountain Almanac move through spectral folk and full-bodied orchestrations involving the Malmö Symphony Orchestra... Delicate yet powerful, and utterly compelling.”

During the period of 2020 - 2023 Karijord scored multiple films including the 2023 score to Margreth Olins Songs of Earth in which Rebekka recorded London Contemporary Orchestra at Air Studios, Hulu documentary I Am Greta about climate activist Greta Thunberg in with she scored together with Jon Ekstrand, Amazon Studios drama thriller feature All the Old Knives with Chris Pine and Thandiwe Newton, Universal Pictures feature biographical documentary Explorer, and HBO thriller doc series thriller Pray, Obey, Kill.

In 2025 she released the album The Bell Tower, in collaboration with vocal ensemble Roomful of Teeth. The album opens with a sample of an interview by the Buddhist environmental philosopher Joanna Macy.

== Discography ==
- Rebekka – Neophyte (2004)
- Rebekka and the Mystery Box – Good or Goodbye (2006)
- Rebekka Karijord – The Noble Art of Letting Go (2009) – LilFacit Records / Control Freak Kitten Records
- Rebekka Karijord – We Become Ourselves (2012) – Control Freak Kitten Records / Sony Music
- Rebekka Karijord – Music for Film and Theatre (2014) – Control Freak Kitten Records
- Rebekka Karijord – Mother Tongue (2017) – Control Freak Kitten Records
- Complete Mountain Almanac with Jessica Dessner (2023) - Bella Union Records
- The Bell Tower with Roomful of Teeth (2025) - Bella Union Records

== Filmography ==
- Ingen mann i sikte (2011)
- Five Star Existence (2011)
- Zero Silence (2011)
- Clara's End (2012)
- Nowhere Home (2012)
- I See You (2014)
- Blood Sisters (2015)
- Doing Good (2016)
- Childhood (2017)
- Living. Loving (2018)
- I Am Greta with Jon Ekstrand (2020) - OONA Recordings
- Pray, Obey, Kill with Jon Ekstrand (2021)
- Cirkusdirektören (2021)
- All the Old Knives (2022)
- Explorer (2022) - OONA Recordings
- Songs of Earth with London Contemporary Orchestra (2023) - OONA Recordings
- My Mercury (2024)
- Deliver Me (2024)
- Possibility of Paradise (2024)
- Raptures (2025)
- This Tempting Madness (2025)
- Tenzing (2026)
- Brace Your Heart (2026)

== Accolades ==
Award	Date	Category	Work	Result	Ref.
IDA Documentary Awards	12 December 2023	Best Original Music Score	Songs of Earth	Nominated	
Cinema Eye Honors	12 January 2024	Outstanding Original Score	Songs of Earth	Nominated	
