= Pray, Obey, Kill =

- Written by: Henrik Georgsson; Anton Berg; Martin Johnson
- Directed by: Henrik Georgsson
- Music by: Jon Ekstrand; Rebekka Karijord
- Countries of origin: United States; Sweden
- Original language: Swedish
- No. of episodes: 6

Production
- Executive producers: Anton Berg; Martin Johnson; Martina Iacobaeus; Johan Idering; Hanka Kastelicová; Hanne Palmquist; Antony Root
- Producers: Ruth Reid; Tine Grew Pfeiffer
- Cinematography: David Hellman; Petrus Sjövik; Shazi Özdemir
- Editors: Patrick Austen; Therese Elfström
- Running time: 59-61 minutes
- Production companies: HBO Documentary Films; HBO Europe; Warner Bros. ITVP Sweden

Original release
- Network: HBO
- Release: April 12 – May 10, 2021

Pray, Obey, Kill is a Swedish-American co-produced documentary miniseries revolving around the Knutby murder and the investigation conducted by journalists Anton Berg and Martin Johnson. It consists of 6-episodes and premiered on HBO Europe on April 4, 2021, and in the United States on HBO on April 12, 2021.

== Plot ==
The series follows Anton Berg and Martin Johnson, who conduct an investigation into the Knutby murder in January 2004, which took place in a Pentecostal congregation cult, when the wife of a pastor is murdered, and a neighbor across the street is injured. The case gains worldwide attention when the assailant claims she received text messages from God, asking her to commit the crime.

== Episodes ==
No.	Title	Directed by	Original release date	U.S. viewers (millions)
1	"Where Truth Lies"	Henrik Georgsson	April 12, 2021	0.122
2	"Dying is Not So Bad"	Henrik Georgsson	April 12, 2021	0.122
3	"Gates of Hell"	Henrik Georgsson	April 19, 2021	0.044
4	"Hand of God"	Henrik Georgsson	April 26, 2021	N/A
5	"Don't Be Afraid to Go Close"	Henrik Georgsson	May 3, 2021	N/A
6	"The Evil God of Knutby"	Henrik Georgsson	May 10, 2021	N/A

== Production ==
In January 2021, it was announced HBO Europe and HBO Documentary Films had co-produced a six-episode documentary series revolving around the Knutby murder with Henrik Georgsson set to direct.
