= Knutby murder =

Murder and assault in Knutby, Sweden, in 2004

The Knutby murder
- Location: Knutby, Sweden
- Date: 10 January 2004 c. 04:40 am
- Attack type: Shooting
- Weapon: Revolver
- Deaths: 1 (Alexandra Fossmo)
- Injuries: 1 (Daniel Linde)
- Perpetrator: Helge Fossmo
- Assailant: Sara Svensson
- Convictions: Instigated murder and instigated murder attempt
- Sentence: Life imprisonment (Helge Fossmo, paroled in 2022)

The Knutby murder (Swedish: Knutbydramat) refers to a murder in the village of Knutby, east of Uppsala, in Sweden on 10 January 2004.

== Murder and arrests ==
At around 04:40, 30-year-old IT entrepreneur Daniel Linde was shot in the head and chest and seriously wounded. Two hours later, it was discovered that his employee and neighbor Alexandra Fossmo had also been shot and was found dead in her bed. The murdered woman was married to Helge Fossmo, a pastor in a local Pentecostal church, who had gone with Daniel Linde in the ambulance to the hospital.

The following day, 26-year-old Sara Svensson confessed to both shootings. She had worked as a nanny for the Fossmo family. Two weeks later, Helge Fossmo and Daniel Linde's wife, Anette, were also arrested. Wiretapping had revealed to the police that Svensson and Helge Fossmo were lovers, and Helge Fossmo and Anette Linde were suspected of instigating both Alexandra Fossmo's murder and the attempted murder of Daniel Linde.

Anette Linde was released after two weeks and never charged.

== Death of Helge Fossmo's first wife ==
Helge Fossmo's first wife, Heléne Fossmo, had been found dead in her bathtub in 1999. Although she had a hole in her skull and toxicology reports indicated a toxic concentration of dextropropoxyphene in her blood, her death had been ruled an accident. After the death of Alexandra Fossmo, the Heléne Fossmo case was reopened and reinvestigated. Helge Fossmo was charged with her murder but was ultimately acquitted.

== Trial ==
At the trial, Sara Svensson gave a detailed confession. She told the court that she had been influenced by anonymous text messages that were forwarded to her by Helge Fossmo. Her credibility was strengthened by the text of erased messages that could be recovered from her mobile phone. On 30 July 2004, Fossmo was sentenced to life in prison for instigated murder and instigated murder attempt. Svensson was sentenced to institutional psychiatric care. In 2006, Fossmo confessed in an interview that he had in fact been involved; until then he had denied all charges laid against him.

== Media coverage ==
The murders and the following police investigation caused a lot of media attention both in Sweden and abroad. Details such as the victims' and perpetrators' involvement in the same cult-like Christian congregation (led by Åsa Waldau, sister of the murdered woman), as well as the pastor's sexual relationships with both the nanny and the wounded man's wife, were extensively covered in the tabloid newspapers. Waldau was frequently called "Kristi brud" (The Bride of Christ) in the media, following news that she had performed an engagement ritual with Jesus. She was also called "Queen Tirsa" by some members of the church and signed her SMS messages "T".

An aspect of the case which aroused widespread media interest was the punishment of the persons involved in the crimes. Helge Fossmo was sentenced to life imprisonment while the person who actually murdered Alexandra Fossmo, Sara Svensson, was released into the custody of the psychiatric ward of Linköping court system (Förvaltningsrätten). In August 2006, she was allowed to walk around the grounds of the psychiatric hospital unsupervised. Twice per month, she was given unsupervised leaves provided she went with a relative to the town of Vadstena or nearby Motala. Starting in March 2007, Svensson was allowed to stay overnight at her father's house. In June 2007, the places she was allowed to visit were expanded to include the city of Linköping.

== Aftermath ==
In 2007, Fossmo married inside the Kumla Prison. In 2008, Fossmo was relocated from Kumla Prison to Tidaholm after receiving death threats from other prisoners. In early 2013, Fossmo had his first day out on parole from the Tidaholm prison. In October 2014, after serving 10 years of his life sentence, Fossmo applied to the court and had his sentenced time determined, which meant that he would be released on parole in 2020. In January 2015, the Göta Court of Appeal repealed the decision, on the penalty requirement of at least 24 years of imprisonment for the severity of the crime, so that the application for parole was premature.

In January 2010, Aftonbladet reported that Sara Svensson began college at the folkhögskola, or folk high school, in Vadstena. In early 2010, she received permission to live on her own during a six-month transition period. She presumably returned to society in late 2010, but Swedish law prevents the disclosure of any details pertaining to her release.

== Cultural influence ==
The Knutby case became so notorious in Sweden that it has been used in fiction as an example of a sensational crime with no need for explanation. The name Knutby has also entered the Swedish language as a metaphor, even in contexts that have nothing to do with crime.

The crimes inspired a six-hour fictionalized Swedish miniseries, Knutby, first shown in 2021.

In 2021, HBO released a documentary about the crime called Pray, Obey, Kill.
