= Yad Hana =

Community settlement in central Israel

Yad Hana: יַד חַנָּה (Hebrew)
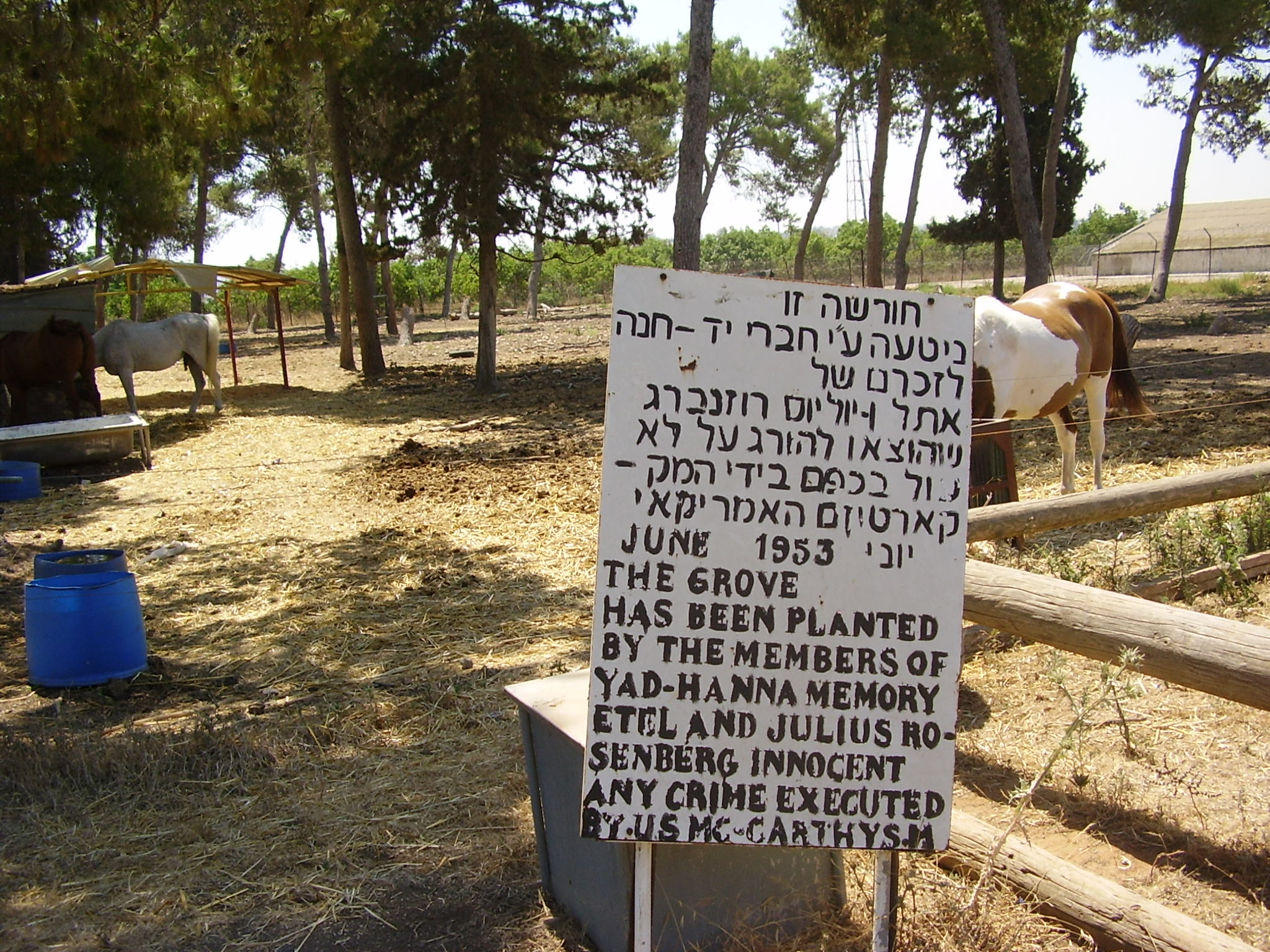

- Location within Central Israel Location within Israel
- Coordinates: 32°19′35″N 35°0′23″E
- Country: Israel
- District: Central
- Subdistrict: HaSharon
- Council: Hefer Valley
- Affiliation: Kibbutz Movement
- Founded: 1950
- Founder: Dror members
- Population (2024): 952

Yad Hana (Hebrew: יַד חַנָּה, lit. 'Hannah's Memorial') is a community settlement and former kibbutz in central Israel. Located in the Sharon plain near Highway 57 and north of the country's center, it falls under the jurisdiction of Hefer Valley Regional Council. In 2024 it had a population of 952.

== History ==
The kibbutz was established in 1950 by a gar'in of Dror members and was named in honour of Hannah Szenes. In 1953, as a result of the split in Mapam (with which the kibbutz members were affiliated), most of the kibbutz members defected to communist Maki. However, 120 members who disagreed with this left the kibbutz to found a new one nearby by the name of Yad Hana Senesh (which was disbanded in 1972). As a result, the initial kibbutz became known as the "only communist kibbutz."

In 2003 the kibbutz was officially rezoned and popularly renamed Yad Hana-Homesh, when the kibbutz accepted the government's privatization package which included absorbing settlers evicted from Homesh as part of Israel's unilateral disengagement plan.

Today Yad Hana is a collective suburb, whose main industry is its own commercial real estate development.
