= Word of Life (Sweden) =

Word of Faith congregation in Sweden

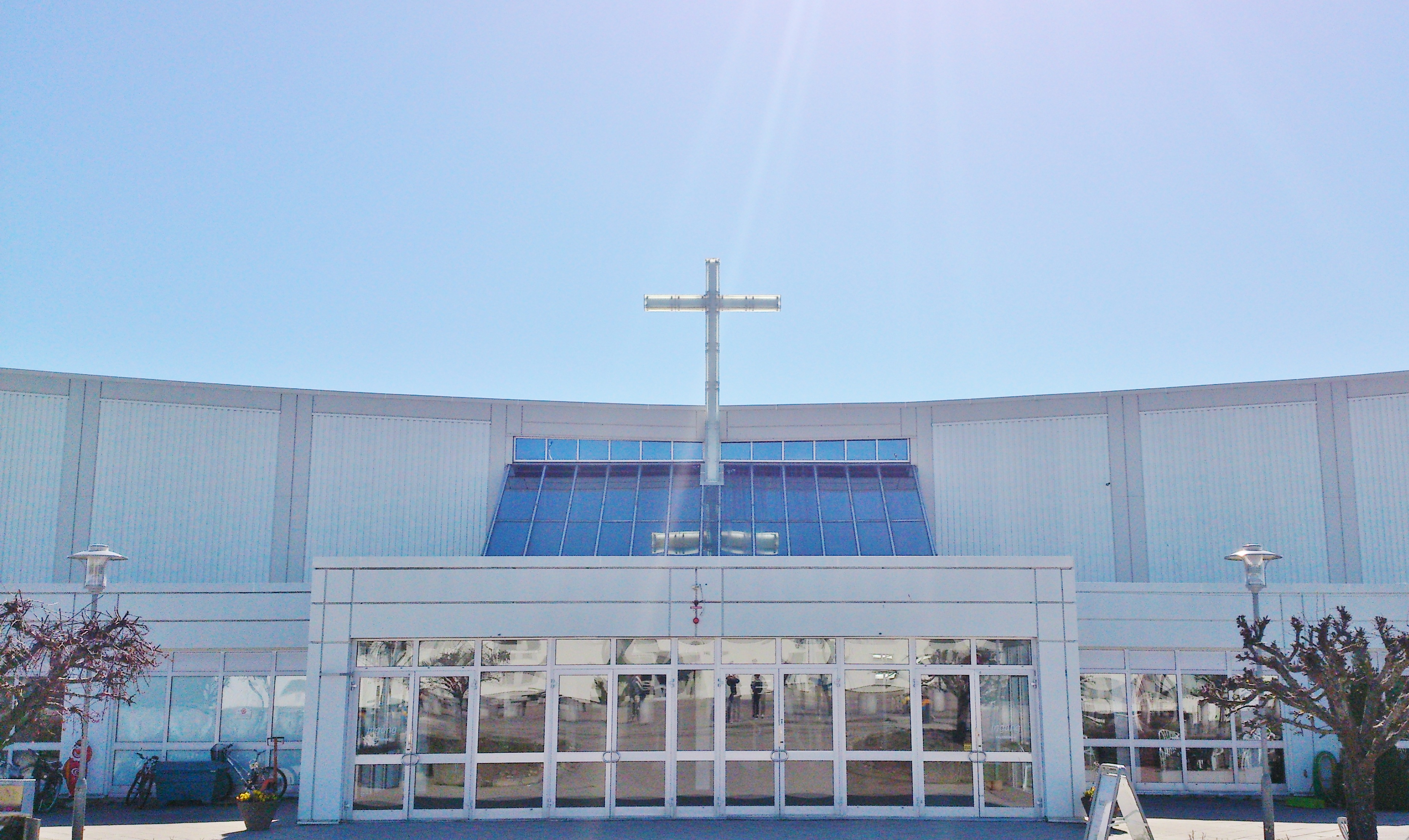
- Word of Life in Uppsala, 2014
- Classification: Evangelicalism
- Orientation: Neo-charismatic movement
- Senior pastor: David Ekerbring
- Headquarters: Uppsala, Sweden
- Origin: 1983
- Members: 1,700
- Official website: livetsord.se/en/

Word of Life (Swedish: Livets Ord) is a megachurch in Uppsala and an international association of churches within the Swedish Word of Faith movement. Livets Ord is the largest example of the neo-charismatic movement in Sweden, closely related to Word of Faith. It may be viewed as a Swedish expression of similar Pentecostal elements in American Christianity.

== History ==
The congregation was founded in Uppsala by Ulf Ekman on 24 May 1983. In 1987, it dedicated its new building in Uppsala. In 2012, it founded Word of Life International, an association of churches it helped establish around the world. Ekman passed on the local pastorship in Uppsala to Joakim Lundqvist in 2013. On 9 March 2014, Ekman announced that he and his wife were leaving the organization, with the intent of joining the Catholic Church. In April 2022, Jan Blom was installed as the senior pastor, but in August he was injured in a serious motorcycle accident, forcing him to go on sick leave. In the fall of 2023, Livets Ord implemented an interim leadership team consisting of Simon Ahlstrand, Sebastian Asklund, and Christian Åkerhielm. In the fall of 2025, David Ekerbring began his tenure as senior pastor.

Aside from churches, the movement also runs academic schools for all ages and Bible schools. It sends missionaries to Russia, Ukraine, Armenia, Azerbaijan, Tajikistan, Afghanistan, Israel, and India. In 2023, Word of Life International had helped establish 1,000 churches.

== Livets Ord Theological Seminary ==
The congregation had its own institution of tertiary education, Livets Ord Theological Seminary, between 1994 and 2014. It was affiliated with an American institution, Oral Roberts University in Tulsa, Oklahoma, the largest charismatic Christian university in the world, accredited by the Higher Learning Commission of the North Central Association of Colleges and Schools. Livets Ord Theological Seminary offered American bachelor's and master's degrees in New Testament studies, history, education, and other fields under the auspices of Oral Roberts University, but it was never accredited by the Swedish National Agency for Higher Education to award Swedish academic degrees.

The seminary announced its closing in February 2014 because it had been operating at a loss.

== Criticism ==
When it was founded, the movement was met with criticism from mass media and other churches, due to what was perceived as an inhumane perspective against people who suffer from physical disabilities and financial poverty, coupled with its authoritarian leadership. Since then, the movement has consolidated, and its views have emerged as somewhat more acceptable to Swedish free churches.

Some of its critics consider it a cult because of its connection with, and usage of theology from within, the Word of Faith movement, though its teachings now are broadened with other, more classical theology.

In November 2015, the church was criticized in a television episode of Uppdrag granskning, notably by the demand of Ulf Ekman to be paid in cash during his interventions in churches, his culture of silence refusing any criticism, and the church's insistence on multiple offerings in addition to the tithe. Pastor Joakim Lundqvist confirmed that the weak culture of dialogue and the insistence on multiple offerings had indeed been problems, but that the church had implemented new policies over the years, and that these problems were therefore no longer relevant.

== Popular culture ==
A parody of the congregation exists in the novel Berts bekymmer, where Klimpen returns to Öreskoga, now as a member of the congregation "Lennarts ord." The congregation runs a bible school in Motala and is led by a person named Lennart.

In Stieg Larsson's novel The Girl with the Dragon Tattoo, journalist Mikael Blomkvist's daughter, Pernilla, is a member of the Light of Life church, which he compares to Word of Life, calling his daughter's church "just about as crackpot as the Word of Life." Her recognition of the Old Testament verses corresponding to a series of numbers in Harriet Vanger's datebook (which Blomkvist initially took to be telephone numbers) helps her father make the connection between Harriet's disappearance in 1966 and a serial killer who used parodies of the punishments laid out in the Book of Leviticus as a "signature" for his murders of various women all over Sweden.

== See also ==
- List of the largest evangelical churches
- List of the largest evangelical church auditoriums
- Church service
