= Maxim restaurant suicide bombing =

2003 Palestinian terror attack in Haifa, Israel

Maxim restaurant bombing
- Part of the Second Intifada militancy campaign
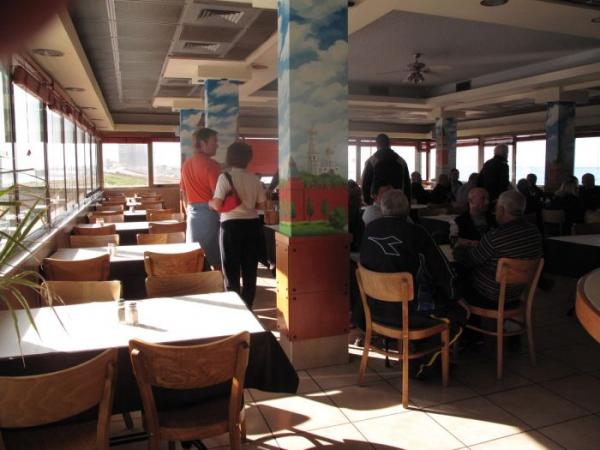
- Maxim restaurant, 2009

- The attack site
- Location: 32°48′46″N 34°57′20″E; Haifa, Israel
- Date: October 4, 2003; 23 years ago 14:10
- Attack type: Suicide bombing
- Deaths: 21 civilians (+1 bomber)
- Injuries: 51
- Perpetrator: PIJ claimed responsibility
- Assailant: Hanadi Jaradat
- No. of participants: 1

The Maxim restaurant bombing was a Palestinian suicide bombing which occurred on October 4, 2003, in the beachfront restaurant Maxim in Haifa, Israel. Twenty-one civilians were killed and 60 were injured. Among the victims were two families and four children, including a two-month-old baby.

The restaurant was frequented by both Arab and Jewish customers and was widely seen as a symbol of peaceful coexistence.

The militant organization Islamic Jihad claimed responsibility for the attack. It was condemned by Palestinian President Yasser Arafat. The restaurant's interior was destroyed by the blast and was completely rebuilt seven months after the attack.

== Background ==
The Maxim restaurant is a beachfront restaurant located near the south entry to Haifa. It is co-owned by Jews and Christian Arabs, and is known for being a symbol of co-existence.

== The attack ==
On October 4, 2003, at 14:10 pm, the 28-year-old Palestinian suicide bomber Hanadi Jaradat detonated the explosive belt she was wearing inside the Arab-Jewish Maxim restaurant in Haifa. 21 Israelis (18 Jews and 3 Arabs) were killed, and 60 others were wounded. The bomb included metal fragments packed around the explosive core, that sprayed around the restaurant, maximizing lethal effect. According to Haifa police sources, the aftermath was gruesome, with some of the dead still sitting upright at their tables, while others, including children and babies, were slammed against the walls. Due to the force of the explosion, all that remained of Jaradat was her head.

Among the victims were two families and four children, including a two-month-old baby. Three Maccabi Haifa officials were lightly injured in the bombing.

== The assailant ==
The suicide bomber, 28-year-old Hanadi Jaradat (Arabic: هنادي تيسير عبد المالك جردات) from Jenin, was the sixth female suicide bomber of the Al-Aqsa Intifada and the second woman recruited by Islamic Jihad.

When she was 21, her fiancé had been killed by Israeli security forces. At the time of her suicide bombing, Jaradat was a law student due to qualify as a lawyer in a few weeks. According to a story in Ha'aretz, based on Arab media and interviews with Israeli and Arab sources, she agreed to the bombing after Israel Defense Forces undercover operatives in Jenin killed her cousin (Salah, 34), and her younger brother (Fadi, 25), both of whom were accused by Israeli forces of being Islamic Jihad operatives, with her cousin being considered to be a senior member of the Al-Quds Brigades group.

== Israeli response ==
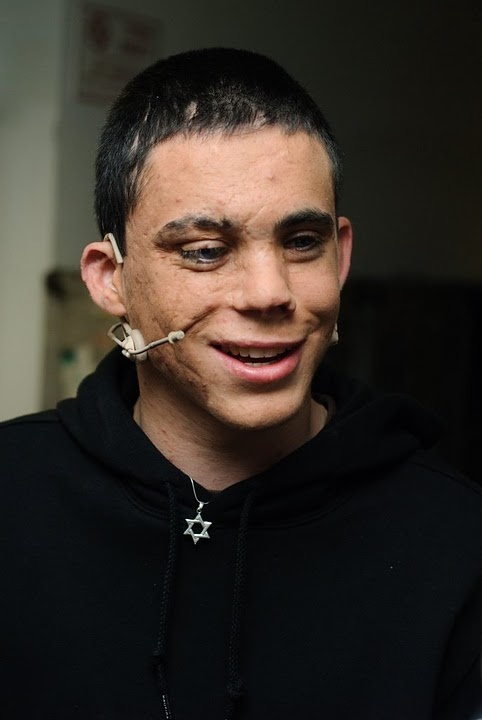
Oran Almog, who was ten years old at time of the bombing, addressed the UN Security Council in 2017 to demand that the Palestinian Authority cease incentivizing terrorism by paying stipends to terrorists.

The day following the suicide bombing, the Israeli Army demolished the home of Jaradat's family, and the homes of two neighbors who were uninvolved in the bombing. In response to the attack, which Israel claimed was planned in the Damascus headquarters of the Palestinian Islamic Jihad, an alleged terrorist training camp in Ain es-Saheb, Syria, was bombed by four Israeli Air Force jets. One person was injured, and munitions were allegedly destroyed during the strike.

Jamal Mahadjne, an Israeli-Arab from Umm al-Fahm, was arrested within hours of the attack for driving Jaradat to her destination. Mahadjne had regularly taken fees for illegally driving Palestinians to Israel, taking advantage of his Israeli identity card to cross the border without difficulty. He confessed his actions to Shin Bet agents, and was indicted before the Haifa District Court for being an accessory to murder and for other crimes relating to his illegal activities on November 10.

On November 7, Israel Defense Forces troops arrested senior Islamic Jihad militant Amjad Abeidi, who planned the attack, along with a number of other suicide bombings, during an operation in Jenin. During the operation, Jenin was placed under curfew as soldiers searched homes. One Palestinian teenager was shot dead while climbing a tank, and three Palestinians were wounded. The complex in which Abeidi was hiding was located and searched, and a weapons cache was found. After a grenade was thrown into the cache, Abeidi was lightly wounded and surrendered. As the soldiers left Jenin with Abeidi, Palestinian militants opened fire at them, and the soldiers returned fire. One militant, a member of the Al-Aqsa Martyrs' Brigades, was killed. Abeidi was handed over to Shin Bet for interrogation.

In 2017 Oran Almog, one of the victims of the attack, addressed the United Nations Security Council to demand that the Palestinian Authority cease incentivizing terrorism by paying stipends to terrorists.

== Official reactions ==
Israeli prime minister Ariel Sharon stated that Israel held Palestinian President Yasser Arafat responsible for the attack. Arafat condemned the bombing. U.S. President George W. Bush condemned the attack, calling it a "murderous action" and a "despicable attack".

== Aftermath ==
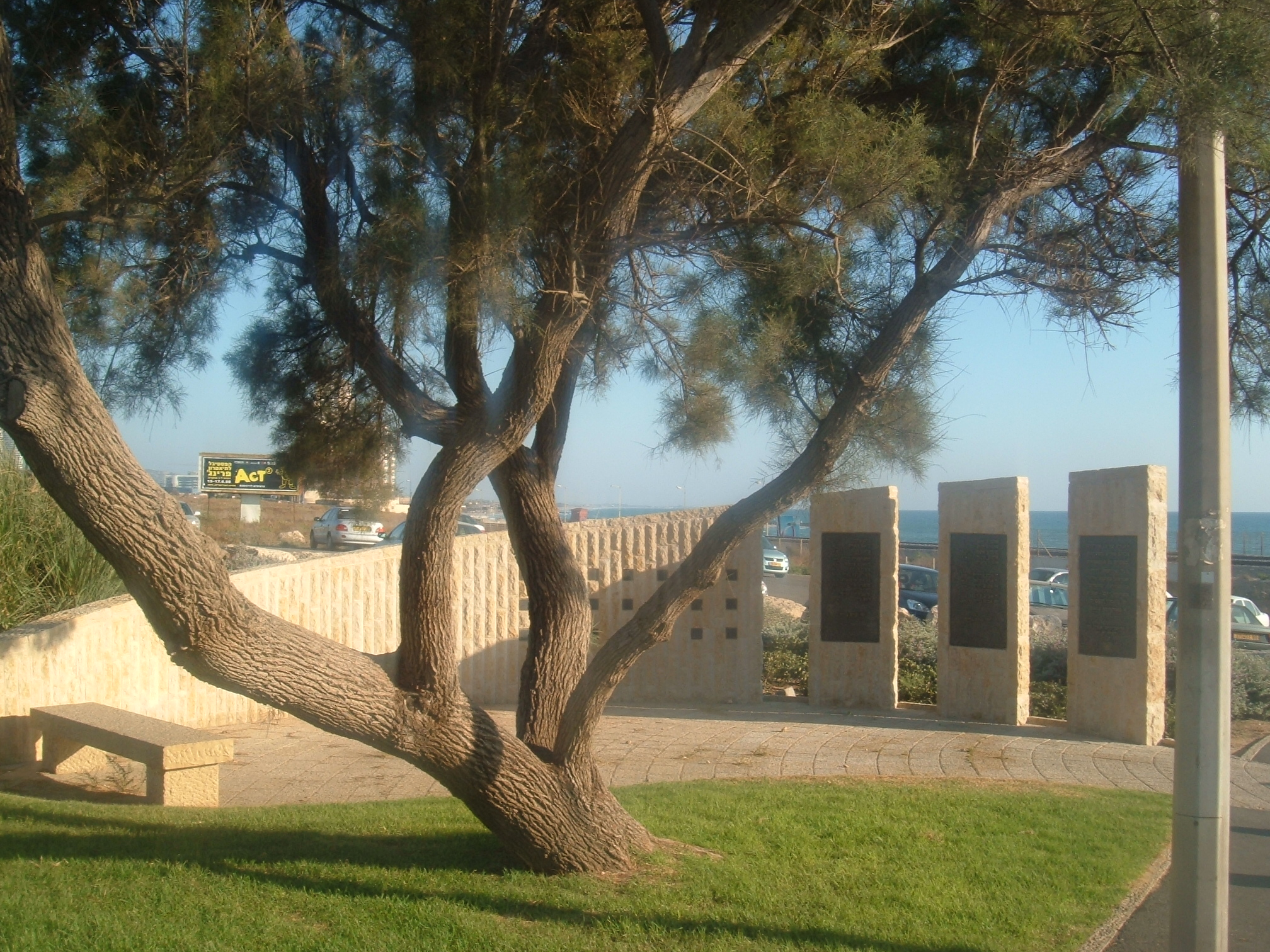
The memorial built near the restaurant, in memory of the victims of the attack

In response to his daughter's actions, her father Taisir declined all condolences, instead saying that he was proud of what his daughter had done, and that "I will accept only congratulations for what she did. This was a gift she gave me, the homeland and the Palestinian people."

In October 2012, the Arab Lawyers Union awarded their top award to Hanadi Jaradat, and sent a delegation to her family to present them with the award. Ayman Abu Eisheh, who is a member of the Palestine Committee at the Arab Lawyers Union, explained that the lawyers were proud of Jaradat, saying that suicide bombing was "in defense of Palestine and the Arab nation."

Although the interior of the restaurant was destroyed in the attack, it was quickly rebuilt and reopened within several months. A monument was erected near the restaurant in memory of the victims killed in the attack.

Sami Jaradat, one of the perpetrators and one of the heads of The Islamic Jihad in Jenin, is planned to be released from prison as part of the January 2025 Gaza war ceasefire.

== See also ==
- Palestinian political violence
- Israeli casualties of war
- Islamic terrorism
