= Word of Faith =

International Christian movement

- Classification: Protestant
- Theology: Neo-charismatic movement, Prosperity theology, New Apostolic Reformation
- Founder: Kenneth Hagin

Word of Faith is a movement within charismatic Christianity which teaches that Christians can achieve power and financial prosperity through prayer, and that those who believe in Jesus's death and resurrection have the right to physical health.

The movement was founded by the American Kenneth Hagin in the 1960s, and has its roots in the teachings of E. W. Kenyon.

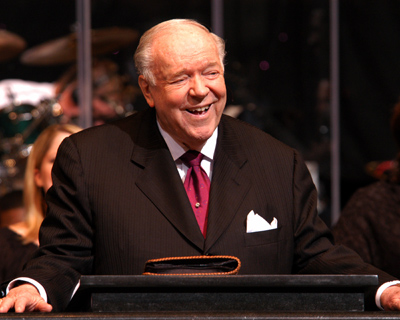
Kenneth E. Hagin (1917–2003), a key figure in shaping and expanding the Word of Faith movement

== History ==
The Baptist minister E. W. Kenyon (1867–1948) is generally cited as the originator of Word of Faith teachings. Kenyon's writings influenced Kenneth Hagin Sr., who scholars have emphasized played the central role in shaping and expanding the modern Word of Faith movement. According to Simon Coleman, Hagin's teachings were closely tied to his personal experiences of healing and his interpretation of biblical passages surrounding faith and speech. After World War II, Hagin became involved in healing revival ministries before gradually moving away from the stricter style of traditional Pentecostalism to charismatic Christianity. This drift allowed him to reach out to a much broader audience, and ultimately led to Hagin leaving the Assemblies of God, as his more flexible approach to faith practice conflicted with the denomination's established norms. His Faith Seminar of the Air, a radio show that aired throughout the U.S and Canada, helped him gain national recognition after moving his ministry, known as the Kenneth E Hagin Evangelistic Association, or Rhema, to Tulsa, Oklahoma, in 1966. Hagin also used mass media platforms, such as the Word of Faith magazine, to reach thousands of households every month. Approximately 16,000 alumni from almost thirty countries, the majority from North America, had graduated from Rhema by the mid-1990s, and Rhema trained thousands of ministers who in turn taught and spread the Word of Faith. Throughout the 20th century, Word of Faith and other large charismatic movements grew significantly worldwide. According to the Pew Research Center, there were approximately 305 million charismatic Christians globally in 2010, with much of this growth concentrated in sub-Saharan Africa and the Asia-Pacific region.

== Teachings ==
Distinctive Word of Faith teachings include physical, emotional, financial, relational, and spiritual healing for those who keep their covenant with God. The movement urges believers to speak what they desire, in agreement with the promises and provisions of the Bible, as an affirmation of God's plans and purposes. They believe this is what Jesus meant when he said in Mark 11:22–24 that believers shall have whatsoever they say and pray with faith. The term word of faith itself is derived from Romans 10:8 which speaks of "the word of faith that we preach".

=== Healing ===
The Word of Faith teaches that complete healing (of spirit, soul, and body) is included in Christ's atonement and therefore is available immediately to all who believe. Frequently cited is Isaiah 53:5, ("by his stripes we are healed"), and Matthew 8:17, which says Jesus healed the sick so that "it might be fulfilled which was spoken by Isaiah the Prophet, 'Himself took our infirmities, and bore our sicknesses'."

Because Isaiah speaks in the present tense ("we are healed"), Word of Faith teaches that believers should accept the reality of a healing that is already theirs, first by understanding that physical healing is part of the New Testament's promise of salvation. It is reinforced by confessing the Bible verses which assert this healing and believing them while rejecting doubt. This does not deny pain, sickness, or disease, but denies its right to supersede the gift of salvation in Isaiah 53:5 and many other passages. According to adherents, sickness is generally Satan's attempt to rob believers of their divine right to total health.

=== Prosperity ===
Word of Faith teaching holds that its believers have a divine right to prosper in all areas of life, including finances, health, marriage, and relationships. Prosperity is not desired for the hoarding of finances but is often framed by followers as a way to support religious missions and charitable giving.

Word of Faith preachers such as Creflo Dollar and Kenneth Copeland claim that Jesus was rich, and teach that modern believers are entitled to financial wealth.

=== Faith and confession ===
In Word of Faith teaching, a central element of receiving from God is "confession", often called "positive confession" or "faith confession" by practitioners. Scholars have analyzed "positive confession" as a central theological component, but also a more practical component of the Word of Faith movement, emphasizing the belief that language functions as a pathway for faith and material outcomes. According to Milmon F. Harrison, this doctrine displays a broader understanding that linking spiritual belief with tangible results in everyday life can be achieved through faith, which can be activated by speech. Practitioners will claim and affirm they have healing, well-being, prosperity, or other promises from God, before actually experiencing such results. They do so in demonstration of their faith, which they believe will ultimately result in the fulfillment of their words. While similar, it is distinguished from Norman Vincent Peale's positive thinking theology, which emphasizes having faith in God and self-confidence by believing in oneself. Noted Word of Faith teachers, such as Kenneth E. Hagin and Charles Capps, have argued that God created the universe by speaking it into existence (Genesis 1), and that God has endowed believers with this power. Thus, making a "positive confession" of God's promise and believing God's word stirs the power of resurrection which raised Christ from the dead (Ephesians 1:19–20, 3:20), and brings that promise to fulfillment. This teaching is interpreted from Mark 11:22–23. A more recent variant of positive confession is "decree and declare". Word of Faith preachers have called faith a "force".

Conversely, "negative confession" is believed to be harmful, and so it is taught that believers should be conscious of their words. This is argued on the interpretation of Proverbs 18:21, "Life and death are in the power of the tongue, and they that love them will eat the fruit thereof", and also Numbers 14:28, "...saith the Lord, as you have spoken in my ears, so will I do", among other biblical passages cited by followers of the movement, who focus on the power of speech in shaping spiritual and material outcomes.

== Criticism ==
Many of the movement's essential beliefs are criticised by other Christians. Christian author Robert M. Bowman, Jr. states that the Word of Faith movement is "neither soundly orthodox nor thoroughly heretical".

One of the earliest critics of Word of Faith teaching was Oral Roberts University professor Charles Farah, who published From the Pinnacle of the Temple in 1979. In the book, Farah expressed his disillusionment with the teachings, which he argued were more about presumption than faith.

In 1982, one of Farah's students, Daniel Ray McConnell, submitted a thesis, Kenyon Connection, to the faculty at Oral Roberts University, tracing the teaching back through Hagin to Kenyon and ultimately to New Thought and calling the distinctive Word of Faith beliefs a heretical "Trojan Horse" in the Christian church. McConnell repeated this argument in his book, A Different Gospel, in 1988.

One of McConnell's classmates, Dale H. Simmons, published his own doctoral research at Drew University, arguing that Kenyon was influenced by heterodox metaphysical movements and the Faith Cure movement of the nineteenth century. In 1990, The Agony of Deceit surveyed the critiques of Word of Faith doctrines. One of the authors, Christian Research Institute founder Walter Martin, issued his personal judgment that Kenneth Copeland was a false prophet and that the movement as a whole was heretical.

Evangelist Justin Peters, an outspoken critic of the Word of Faith movement, wrote his Master of Divinity thesis on Benny Hinn and has appeared frequently as an expert on Word of Faith pastors in documentaries and TV news stories. In his seminar "Clouds Without Water", he traces the movement's origins to the Phineas Quimby's New Thought and E. W. Kenyon's Positive Confession in the late 19th and early 20th centuries.

In contrast, Pastor Joe McIntyre, now head of Kenyon's Gospel Publishing Society in Washington, argues that the primary influences of Kenyon were A.B. Simpson and A.J. Gordon of the Faith Cure branch of the Evangelical movement. McIntyre's version is told in the authorized biography, E. W. Kenyon: The True Story. The same year, Pentecostal scholar Gordon Fee wrote a series of articles denouncing what he called The Disease of the Health-and-Wealth Gospel.

Hank Hanegraaff published his book Christianity in Crisis in 1993, which revolves around the rejection of modern movements like Word of Faith, as he believed it departed from orthodox Christian doctrine, by having unorthodox views on the nature of God, Jesus and humanity, as well as characterizing some associated churches as cult-like. Since the 1990s, Hanegraaff has continued to address Word of Faith teachings through his Christian Research Institute ministry.

Other critics, such as Norman Geisler, Dave Hunt and Roger Oakland, have denounced Word of Faith theology as aberrant and contrary to the teachings of the Bible.

One of the movement's prominent critics, who was a part of the Grace Community Church, is John MacArthur. Macarthur described prosperity gospel beliefs as theologically unorthodox. He believes that well-known Word of Faith leaders have taken advantage of and deceived their financially struggling followers through the movement.

=== "Little gods" belief ===
Many Word of Faith teachers use phrases such as "little gods" to describe believers. Kenneth Hagin wrote that God had created humans "in the same class of being that he is himself," and reasoned that if humans are made in God's image, they are "in God's class", and thereby 'gods'. E. W. Kenyon wrote, "Every man who has been 'born again' is an Incarnation, and Christianity is a miracle. The believer is as much an Incarnation as was Jesus of Nazareth."

Many Evangelical critics have condemned the "little gods" teaching as cultic. Hank Hanegraaff, for example, contends the 'little gods' doctrine is on a par with the teachings of the Maharishi Mahesh Yogi and Jim Jones.

== See also ==
- Full Gospel – Evangelical doctrine
- Chris Oyakhilome – Nigerian pastor (born 1963)
- Abundant life – Part of the Christian teachings
- Margaret Court – Australian former tennis player (born 1942)
- Sam P. Chelladurai
- Word of Faith Ministries
- Word of Faith Fellowship – Evangelical church in Spindale, North Carolina, US
