= Search for the Truth =

2007 anti-Mormon video

Search for the Truth (also known by the name Jesus Christ/Joseph Smith in its DVD form) is an anti-Mormon video produced by Tri-Grace Ministries. The video begins with the claim that Jesus Christ and Joseph Smith were "two of the world's most prominent and influential men." It then presents what it claims to be the teachings of Joseph Smith and contrasts them to what it claims to be the teachings of Jesus Christ. A question is raised regarding whether the movements which the video classifies as "Christianity" and "Mormonism" are compatible, despite the claim by both that "Jesus is the Christ." The video takes portions of the Book of Mormon and compares it to the Bible. The video implies that people must follow Jesus or Joseph Smith but cannot follow both.

== Distribution ==
The production of the DVD was funded by "an ex-Mormon businessman who financed the project by selling stock in his company." The video was distributed by many groups, one of which was called Concerned Christians, Inc.: the same group that initially distributed the film The God Makers in 1982. The producers claim that the video was made out of love for the Mormon people. The video distributed around 500,000 videos in Utah and 5,000 in the Palmyra New York region. A letter of instruction was included with copies of the DVD to those that were to perform the initial door-to-door distribution, several days before the 177th Annual General Conference of the church that was held on March 31 and April 1, 2007:

This video is to be viewed by CHRISTIANS ONLY until AFTER the nation-wide distribution which is scheduled for March 25, 2007. In-other-words, do not allow any Mormon people to view the video or learn of our intended evangelistic outreach until after March 25, 2007. Why such extreme caution? If the leadership of the Mormon cult learns of our plans, they will publicly instruct their people not to watch the video and many Mormons will blindly obey.

The letter goes on to say that the "Mormon Church is vulnerable. We firmly believe that with enough exposure, Mormonism will crumble and become a shadow of what it is today."

Slick actions by Evangelicals were continued in the letter which spoke of "HANGING THE DVD ON DOOR KNOBS THE VIDEO DOES THE TALKING and, in fact, we do not advise or encourage interaction with Mormon people until sometime after the distribution is complete." They continue to justify this reason because they believed that the DVD "exposes the false teachings of the Mormon cult." and "As a result, people who view the video are much less likely to be converted to Mormonism and these people often use the information found in the DVD to challenge their LDS neighbors and/or LDS missionaries." In the DVD itself, it states that "This video has been produced out of love for our Lord Jesus Christ and love for our Mormon and Christian friends." However, FairMormon, has stated that "the numerous mischaracterizations, misrepresentations, errors, and outright falsehoods found on the DVD make it difficult for believing Latter-day Saints to see that expression of love as sincere." To add to controversies made by the DVD, it is nowhere stated in the letter to distributors that they intend to show love to Mormons, only to "shut down the Mormon machine and lead a multitude of lost souls out of this cult and into a personal relationship with Jesus Christ. (assuming that members of the Church of Jesus Christ of Latter-Day Saints don't already have a relationship with Jesus)."

== Content ==
=== Nature of God and Jesus Christ ===
Dr. Phil Roberts (President, Midwestern Baptist Theological Seminary), claims that the "Jesus of Mormonism" is different than the "Jesus of the Bible." Roberts claims that Mormons believe that God became a god "by adherence to a system of Mormonism in a previous world in a previous life."

Dr. John Whitcomb (Theology Professor, Old Testament Scholar), quotes and interprets passages from the Bible to support this claim. Referring to Paul's statement in 1 Corinthians 8:4 about "many gods and many lords," Whitcomb points to his head and states that "the Bible says through the Apostle Paul they're only in here."

Dave Hunt (Author and Founder, The Berean Call Ministries) states that the serpent in the Garden of Eden promised Eve that "she could become a god." Hunt continues by claiming that Brigham Young said that "the devil told the truth."

Charles Larson (Historian, Author) claims that the Book of Abraham, one of the Mormon standard works of scripture, authorizes lying by God, and states that the account of Abraham claiming that his wife was his sister, "is similar to the Bible version only in the book of Abraham god is telling Abraham to lie."

President Gordon B. Hinckley, President of the Church of Jesus Christ of Latter-day Saints, is misquoted as saying, "No I don't believe in the traditional Christ. The traditional Christ of whom they speak is not the Christ of whom I speak, for the Christ of whom I speak has been revealed in this, the dispensation of the fullness of times."

=== Character of Joseph Smith ===
A quote from the Bible (Ephesians 2:8-9) regarding boasting is juxtaposed with a quote from Joseph Smith in which he claims to boast.

The narrator repeats a portion of a quote from Brigham Young, in which he claims that “no man or woman in this dispensation will ever enter the celestial kingdom of god without the consent of Joseph Smith.”

It is claimed that Mormons believe that their "godhood rests on the act of polygamy”, based upon a portion of a quote made by Brigham Young in 1866: “The only men who become Gods, even the sons of God, are those who enter into polygamy.”

=== First Vision ===
It is stated that nine different versions of Joseph Smith's first vision were recorded. The on-screen list includes both accounts of the first vision that is claimed to have occurred in the Sacred Grove and several accounts of the visit of an angel in Smith's bedroom. The onscreen list shows the following accounts:

1. 1827 – A spirit appears to Joseph telling him of a record on gold plates at age 17.
2. 1827 – An angel appears to Joseph telling him he has been chosen to be a prophet and bring forth a record on gold plates at age 18.
3. 1830 – An angel tells Joseph where to find a secret treasure. Joseph returns once a year for several years before obtaining the plates.
4. 1832 – Jesus Christ appears to Joseph at age 15.
5. 1834 – Angel appears to Joseph in his bedroom at age 17.
6. 1835 – Two personages appear to Joseph in grove at age 14.
7. 1835 – Many angels appear to Joseph in grove at age 14.
8. 1838 – God the Father and Jesus appear to Joseph in grove at age 14.
9. 1844 – Two unidentified personages appear to Joseph at age 14.

The narrator claims that Brigham Young “denied that the Lord came to Joseph Smith in the first vision.” Several sentences from a speech given by Brigham Young are shown which state, “The Lord did not come…but He did send His angel to this same obscure person, Joseph Smith…and informed him that he should not join any religious sects of the day…”

=== Archaeology ===
The narrator states that because Joseph Smith's writings are now over 150 years old, that they should be “easily validated by historical and archaeological evidences.” A 1969 quote by BYU professor Dee Green is referenced in which he “confesses” that “No book of Mormon location is known.” It is stated that “not even one coin” has been found, and that coins were mentioned as “being common in Joseph's writings.”

Joel Kramer (Director, Living Hope Ministries) relates that his group went to the Middle East and Central America and talked to experts in archaeology and anthropology. Kramer states that “in all cases” that they found the “historical reliability” of the Bible and that for the Book of Mormon it was “non-existent.”

Floyd McElveen (Author and Lifetime Evangelist) adds that “Joseph Smith claimed there were huge cites – thirty eight cities in the Americas,” but that “not one single city has ever been dug up.” McElveen adds, “would you want to base your eternity on something that is totally unknown?”

Sandra Tanner (President, Utah Lighthouse Ministry) notes that the LDS Church will not “commit itself” to a specific map of Book of Mormon lands.

=== Prophecies ===
Joseph Smith is claimed to have described “the inhabitants of the moon as being about six-foot tall, dressed like Quakers, and living to be about 1000 years old.” The narrator adds that “Since Neil Armstrong's walk on the moon in 1969, we now know there are no Quaker looking people on the moon.” In addition, Brigham Young thought that the sun was also inhabited.

=== Occult ===
The video notes that on March 15, 1842, Joseph Smith joined the Masons, which is claimed by the narrator to be “an organization that believes that Jesus is not divine.” It is further claimed that certain Mormon practices and architecture have “Masonic overtones.”

The video cites comments made by LDS historian Dr. Reed Durham regarding an item referred to as the “Jupiter Talisman," which is said to have been owned by Joseph Smith. The narrator refers to this as an "occultic" item whose “talismatic magic” is said to bring riches, power and women to its possessor. The narrator claims that the talisman was “found in Joseph's pocket the day he died in Carthage.”

The video includes a segment copied from the 1982 film The God Makers, which shows what it claims to be a re-enactment of Mormon temple rituals.

=== Translator ===
The narrator states that Joseph Smith “boasted the bold claim” that the Book of Mormon was the “most accurate book in existence.”

== Response ==
The Church of Jesus Christ of Latter-day Saints responded with a news release, part of which stated,

"The Church of Jesus Christ of Latter-day Saints has weathered such attacks throughout its history. At a time when the Church is growing strongly throughout the world, it's not surprising that some groups try to curb that growth in such ways."

The Anti-Defamation League, an advocacy group which fights anti-Semitism, condemned the video as "nothing more than 'Mormon bashing'." Bill Straus, Regional Director of the Anti-Defamation League, stated,

"This is the same kind of plain, old-fashioned Mormon-bashing that Jim Robertson and his group have been spewing for over a quarter-of-a-century. The only difference is that back then, it was the film, 'The God Makers,' and today it's the DVD, 'Jesus Christ/Joseph Smith.' It was wrong then, and it's wrong now."

The LDS Church noted in its news release that, "The Jewish Anti-Defamation League in Phoenix promptly condemned the distribution, saying that 'hate directed at any of us is hate directed at all of us.'" Bill McKeever, Director of an organization called the Mormonism Research Ministry, sent a letter to the First Presidency of The Church of Jesus Christ of Latter-day Saints protesting what he called the church's "tacit approval" of the Anti-Defamation League's condemnation of the video. McKeever states, "I wish to express my indignation at your church's tacit approval of the Anti-Defamation League's accusation of hatred towards Christians who were involved in a recent DVD distribution. It is one thing to disagree with the content of the DVD, but it is quite another to accuse them of being motivated by hate." He concludes by stating, "With all the talk of repentance at your last conference, I think you need to lead by example and offer an apology to the thousands of Christians you have offended with this false accusation." McKeever followed up on this letter with an article posted in the Christian Examiner Online, in which he claimed that the "Mormon Church went into one of its most hypocritical frenzies in modern times." Claiming that the media in Utah is "either owned by the LDS Church or is sympathetic to it," McKeever claimed that "[t]alk show hosts did their best to stir up their listeners against the 'religious bigots' who dared come onto 'our property' with their 'message of hate.'"

The Foundation for Apologetic Information & Research (FAIR), a non-profit organization specializing in Mormon apologetics, produced a point-by-point rebuttal of inaccuracies and exaggerations in the video. This was posted on the FAIR Wiki web site one week before the initial distribution of the DVD. In addition, the LDS affiliated Foundation for Ancient Research and Mormon Studies posted a page with links to articles written by Mormon scholars which deal directly with subjects addressed in the video.
