= Douglas E. Cowan =

Canadian academic

The Reverend Douglas E. Cowan
- Born: Douglas Edward Cowan; 14 August 1958 (age 68); Canada

Ecclesiastical career
- Religion: Christianity
- Church: United Church of Canada

Academic background
- Education: University of Victoria; St. Andrews Theological College; University of Calgary
- Thesis: "Bearing False Witness" (1999)
- Doctoral advisor: Irving Hexham

Academic work
- Discipline: Religious studies; sociology
- Sub-discipline: Sociology of religion
- Institutions: University of Missouri–Kansas City; University of Waterloo
- Main interests: New religious movements; religion and popular culture
- Website: artsweb.uwaterloo.ca/~decowan

Douglas Edward Cowan (born 14 August 1958) is a Canadian academic in religious studies and the sociology of religion and currently holds a teaching position at Renison University College, University of Waterloo, Ontario, Canada. Prior to this appointment he was Assistant Professor of Sociology & Religious Studies at the University of Missouri–Kansas City.

== Education and career ==
Cowan was born in Canada and received his undergraduate education at the University of Victoria where he was awarded a Bachelor of Arts degree in English literature. He then proceeded to theological studies and received a Master of Divinity degree from St. Andrews Theological College. His doctoral work, which involved an examination of the Christian countercult movement through the prism of the sociology of knowledge and propaganda theory, was undertaken through the University of Calgary. Cowan served as the minister for the United Church of Canada in Cardston, Alberta, an area with a population which was over 90 percent Mormon. Cowan read The God Makers, an anti-Mormon classic by Dave Hunt and Ed Decker, in order to learn about Mormons before his posting. However, upon arriving in Cardston, he found Mormons entirely different than what Hunt and Decker had described. Cowan later wrote "I was so struck by the disparity between Hunt and Decker's hostile, pugnacious description of Mormonism and my experience in this profoundly LDS enclave that I began to collect materials similar to theirs from evangelical bookstores and churches across southern Alberta. I wanted to understand this strange obsession with the dangerous religious Other, and I was astonished at just how much of it there was and how deeply ingrained it is in evangelical culture." This experience informed his doctoral dissertation and early academic work on "those whose Christian identity is shaped at least as much by their opposition to other religious traditions as by devotion to their own."

After graduating with a Doctor of Philosophy degree in 1999 Cowan received a joint appointment in the Department of Sociology/CJC and the UMKC Center for Religious Studies. During 2005 he relocated from the US to his current teaching post at the University of Waterloo in Ontario, Canada.

In 2019 he received an Arts Award for Excellence in Research from the University of Waterloo.

== Bibliography ==
- Haddon, Jeffrey K. (1 November 2000). Cowan, Douglas E. (ed.). Religion on the Internet: Research Prospects and Promises (1st ed.). Amsterdam [u.a.]: JAI. ISBN 978-0762305353.
- Cowan, Douglas E. (30 November 2003). The Remnant Spirit: Conservative Reform in Mainline Protestantism. Westport, Conn. [u.a.]: Praeger. ISBN 978-0275974497.
- Cowan, Douglas E. (30 May 2003). Bearing False Witness? An Introduction to the Christian Countercult. Westport, Conn. [u.a.]: Praeger. ISBN 978-0275974596.
- Dawson, Lorne L.; Cowan, Douglas E., eds. (22 July 2004). Religion Online: Finding Faith on the Internet. New York: Routledge. ISBN 978-0415970228.
- Cowan, Douglas E. (18 November 2004). Cyberhenge: Modern Pagans on the Internet. New York: Routledge. ISBN 978-0415969116.
- Cowan, Douglas E.; Bromley, David G. (24 September 2007). Cults and New Religions: A Brief History. Oxford: Blackwell. ISBN 978-1405161282.
- Cowan, Douglas E. (1 October 2008). Sacred Terror: Religion and Horror on the Silver Screen. Waco, Tex.: Baylor University Press. ISBN 978-1602580183.
- Sacred Space: The Quest for Transcendence in Science Fiction Film and Television (2010). Waco,: Baylor UP
- America’s Dark Theologian: The Religious Imagination of Stephen King. (2018) New York University Press.
- Magic, Monsters, and Make-Believe Heroes: How Myth and Religion Shape Fantasy Culture (2019)
- The Christian Countercult Movement (2023). Cambridge University Press.

== See also ==
- Anti-cult movement
- List of University of Waterloo people
