= The Godmakers =

The Godmakers may refer to:

- The God Makers (film), a 1982 anti-Mormon film produced by Ed Decker, or the book of the same title by Decker and Dave Hunt
  - The God Makers II, the film's sequel, or the book of the same title
- The Godmakers (novel), a 1972 science fiction novel by Frank Herbert
- Godmakers, an album by The Red Death
