= Dave Breese =

American pastor (1926–2002)

David William Breese
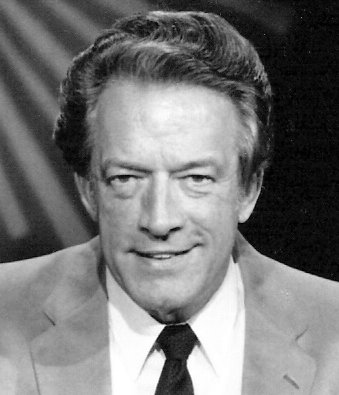
- Born: October 14, 1926; Chicago, Illinois, U.S.
- Died: May 3, 2002 (aged 75); Hillsboro, Kansas, U.S.
- Occupations: Bible teacher, Televangelist, Assistant Pastor, Theologian

David William Breese (October 14, 1926 – May 3, 2002) was an evangelical Christian pastor and theologian from the mid-20th century to the early 21st century.

== Early life ==
Breese was born in Chicago to David and Ruth (Gunton) Breese. He was the youngest of four children, having three older sisters including, Betty, and twin sisters, Mary and Margaret ("Marge"). He also had a foster brother, Bob Gaudio, whom Breese's parents took in as a child. Breese attended Lane Technical High School, an all-boys school with 8,000 students. As a youth, he had been fascinated by airplanes and flying. During World War II, Breese entered Pre-Flight Training at Lane Tech, in the hope of serving his country.

When he was in high school, all of Breese's sisters were involved in a, "Hi-C Club," a Christian youth organization. One week, when Breese was 16 years old, the Hi-C meeting was held at his house. Though Breese had no interest in religious pursuits, he heard a woman clearly present a Gospel message while teaching on the Holy Bible's Book of Romans. A couple weeks later, he decided to believe the message and was converted to belief in Jesus Christ.

=== Further schooling ===
Breese completed his undergraduate studies at Judson University, in Elgin, Illinois, and then went on to Northern Baptist Seminary, in Lombard, Illinois. Breese, who always desired to learn how to fly, earned a "multiengine rating" and, in the years that followed, he flew himself to speaking engagements all across the country.

== Ministry ==
Breese was a member of Youth for Christ throughout the 1950s, and later became the Executive Director of the movement's Chicagoland chapter, giving a speech entitled "Global Struggle for Minds of Men" to a Chicago crowd in December 1963. He founded his own ministry named "Christian Destiny Ministries" in 1963, and later expanded his ministry to radio broadcasts with Dave Breese Reports beginning in 1978. This radio broadcast eventually moved over into television. Breese later added another program to his roster in 1987, entitled The King Is Coming, which he used to promote his own premillennialist beliefs. Breese's family has told stories of the labour he poured into his radio work, with Breese sitting up late at night, making radio programs on a simple recorder with a blanket over his head. This was to block outside noises, as, at that time, he lacked a recording studio.

Breese was eventually succeeded as president of Christian Destiny Ministries, and later on he became a strong critic of progressive dispensationalism, which he believed had taken over many mainstream evangelical churches, but was not biblically sound. Breese was also critical of what was known to him as the full-orbed gospel, more commonly known as the social gospel, which seeks to apply Christian ethics and evangelism to social justice issues such as poverty and substance abuse. Breese argued that the social gospel inverts the real relationship between the two, and that one must first be born-again before the lasting transformative power of the gospel can help bring about solutions to these issues. Another common topic In the writings of Breese is the pre-tribulation rapture, which he promoted as being a valid teaching.

Around the time of the Moral Majority's onset in the 1980's, Breese told an audience at the National Association of Evangelicals that:

"It no longer fits to picture us as redneck preachers pounding the pulpit. Evangelical Christianity has become the greatest show on earth. Twenty to forty years ago it was on the edge of things. Now it has moved to the center."

In the Anti-Mormon film The God Makers II, Breese makes an appearance in which he criticises the LDS Church and its doctrines.

== Family life ==
Breese married Carol Flaming, whom he met at a meeting in Winona Lake, Indiana. They had two daughters, Lynn and Noelle. Just as his parents had a foster son named Bob, Breese and his wife provided a home for a young Laotian boy, Lomae, who is considered part of the extended Breese family today.

In addition to his prolific writing, Breese was also a poet. His sister, Betty, has told of how in his early years his mother would have a young Dave Breese recite poetry. This contributed to his abilities as a public speaker and writer.

== Accomplishments ==
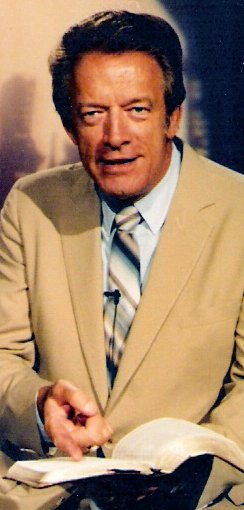
Dave Breese

Breese was:

- A formative force in the early years of Youth For Christ, serving 13 years.
- Influential in the establishment of the AWANA Youth Association.
- A speaker on Back to the Bible Broadcast’s, "Pause For Good News," for 13 years.
- A member of the Board of the National Religious Broadcasters and the National Association of Evangelicals.
- Founder of the "Christian Destiny" ministry, in 1963.
- President and Bible teacher on, "The King Is Coming" telecast
- Radio Broadcaster on, "Dave Breese Reports," and, "Dave Breese Reporting."
- Consultant and friend to presidents, statesmen and religious leaders.

By the 1980s, Breese had gained national prominence via his radio broadcasts "Dave Breese Reports" and "Dave Breese Reporting!" His network of over a hundred stations covered much of the United States. In the mid-'80s, Breese accepted the call to become speaker on "The King is Coming" telecast and later assumed the presidency of the telecast’s parent organization, "World Prophetic Ministry." His outreach via television spanned the globe, reaching across all of America and into 57 nations of the world.

== Major publication ==
In 1990, Breese published Seven Men Who Rule the World from the Grave (ISBN 0-8024-8449-2). The seven men he highlighted are:

- Charles Darwin, who systematized and advanced the principle that evolution was behind the origin of species.
- Karl Marx, who developed and advocated the notion of modern Communism.
- Julius Wellhausen, who initiated "higher criticism" and "modernism."
- John Dewey, who argued for an educational system focused on problem solving and the growth of the child in all aspects of his being.
- Sigmund Freud, who promoted the view that the sexual instinct is the driving force behind all human action.
- John Maynard Keynes, who advocated the policies for reducing unemployment and expanding the economy that today find their expression in deficit spending and governmental activism.
- Søren Kierkegaard, who stressed the obligation each person has to make conscious, responsible choices among alternatives, a major tenet of existentialism.

== Final days ==
Just after the year 2000 rang in, Breese suffered a stroke. He had rarely turned down an invitation to preach. In an average year, he would travel over 100,000 miles to speak at churches, Bible conferences, colleges, universities, evangelistic meetings and debates. The busy schedule had taken its toll. After his stroke, he continued to write.

Breese died May 3, 2002.

== References in popular culture ==
- The alternative band They Might Be Giants used samples from Breese in their song "They Might Be Giants" from the album Flood.
