= Gilbert W. Scharffs =

Gilbert Woodrow Scharffs
- Born: June 27, 1930
- Died: February 26, 2015 (aged 84)
- Education: University of Utah; New York University; Brigham Young University
- Occupations: Religious educator, author
- Known for: LDS scholarship; history of Mormonism in Germany
- Notable work: Mormonism in Germany (1970); The Truth About "The God Makers" (1986); Mormons & Masons (2006)
- Spouse: Laura Virginia Smith
- Children: 4 (including Brett G. Scharffs)

Gilbert Woodrow Scharffs (June 27, 1930 - February 26, 2015) was a Latter-day Saint religious educator and author.

== Biography ==
Scharffs was born to Fritz and Louise Scharffs and raised in the Church of Jesus Christ of Latter-day Saints (LDS Church). He served as a missionary in the German Mission of the LDS Church in the late 1950s, where he served as editor for publications and later second counselor to the Mission President. In 1959 he was married in the Salt Lake Temple to Laura Virginia Smith, a granddaughter of LDS President Joseph F. Smith. They would have four children, one of which, Brett, would become a legal scholar.

Scharffs received a B.A. in marketing from the University of Utah in the class of 1954, a master's degree in business from New York University, and a Ph.D. in religion from Brigham Young University (BYU) in 1969. His doctoral research was on the history of Mormons in Germany, where Scharffs had served as a missionary, and his dissertation was published by Deseret Book in 1970. Historian Donald Q. Cannon considers Scharffs' dissertation as part of the "major scholarly contribution to the study of Mormon history" that occurred during the 1960s.

For many years Scharffs taught with the Church Educational System (CES). He was on the faculty of the Institute of Religion adjacent to the University of Utah for 27 years, having served as director following Reed C. Durham in 1974. Scharffs also taught at BYU.

Among other callings in the church, Scharffs has served multiple times as a stake missionary, a bishop in the early 1990s, and a counselor in a stake presidency.

== Writings ==
=== Books ===
- Scharffs, Gilbert W. (1970). Mormonism in Germany: A History of The Church of Jesus Christ of Latter-day Saints in Germany Between 1840 and 1970. Salt Lake City, Utah: Deseret Book.
- —— (1983). 101 Reasons Why I Like to Go to Church. Salt Lake City, Utah: Hawkes Publishing. ISBN 0-89036-181-9.
- —— (1986). The Truth About "The God Makers". Salt Lake City, Utah: Publishers Press. Issued again in 1989, republished by Bookcraft in 1994.
- —— (2002). The Missionary's Little Book of Answers. American Fork, Utah: Covenant Communications. ISBN 1-59156-038-1.
- —— (2006). Mormons & Masons. Setting the Record Straight. Orem, Utah: Millennial Press. ISBN 1-932597-37-9.

Scharffs response to The God Makers is also available online at the Foundation for Apologetic Information and Research's website.

=== Articles ===
- Scharffs, Gilbert W. (April 1971). "The Branch that Wouldn't Die". Ensign. 1 (4): 31–33.
- —— (August 1972). "The Case Against Easier Abortion Laws". Ensign. 2 (8): 53.
- —— (Spring 1974). "[Book review of] Discovering the World of the Bible". BYU Studies. 14 (3): 393–395.
- —— (December 1988). "Unique Insights on Christ from the Book of Mormon". Ensign. 18 (12): 8–13.
- —— (1992). "Apostate". In Daniel H. Ludlow (ed.). Encyclopedia of Mormonism. Vol. 1. New York: Macmillan. p. 59.
- —— (January 1995). "Some people say it is best to leave alone materials that claim to 'expose' the Church and its teachings. What counsel has been given on this? How do we respond when a friend comes to us with questions found in such materials?". Ensign. 25 (1): 61–62.
- —— (2002). "Das Buch Mormon: The German Translation of the Book of Mormon". Journal of Book of Mormon Studies. 11 (1): 35–39, 109. JSTOR 10.5406/jbookmormstud.11.1.0035. S2CID 254215978.

=== Other ===
- Scharffs, Gilbert W. (1960), A Decade of Mormonism in U.S. Journalism, Unpublished paper in the BYU Harold B. Lee Library.
- Stout, Hosea; —— (1967), Excerpts from the Journal of Hosea Stout Arranged in Topic form Giving Dates, Places and Page Numbers for Each Entry, Unpublished paper in the BYU Harold B. Lee Library.
- —— (1967), An Appraisal of the Current Trends in the Growth and Geographic Distribution of the Mormon Church, Unpublished paper in the BYU Harold B. Lee Library.
- —— (1967), No Sir, That's Not Research: A Search for the References Cited in Quest for Empire; The Political Kingdom of God and the Council of Fifty in Mormon History, Unpublished paper in the BYU Harold B. Lee Library.
- —— (1969), History of The Church of Jesus Christ of Latter-day Saints in Germany Between 1840 and 1968, Ph.D. dissertation, Provo, Utah: Brigham Young University, Department of Graduate Studies in the College of Religious Instruction
