= Jeremiah Films =

American media production and distribution company

- Formation: 1978
- Founder: Patrick Matrisciana
- Purpose: Media production and media distribution
- Location: Jacksonville Beach, Florida, United States
- Products: Catholic-Christian films
- CEO: Patrick Matrisciana

Jeremiah Films is an independent media production and distribution company. The organization was founded by Patrick Matrisciana in 1978. As of 2012, they are based in Jacksonville Beach, Florida.

== Organizational background ==
Jeremiah Films produces videos that the group says "promote patriotism, traditional values, and the Biblical worldview of [the] founding fathers" of the United States. It has produced films that investigate subjects as varied as terrorism, paganism, evolution, Mormonism, Seventh-day Adventism, abortion, Halloween, Islam, Christianity, Cults, the occult, Jim Jones, Jehovah's Witness, and the Clinton presidency and scandals surrounding Gennifer Flowers and the alleged murder of Vince Foster.

== Filmography ==
In 1996, Jeremiah Films distributed a film titled The Clinton Chronicles, which contains a list of people who were linked to President Bill Clinton who either died mysteriously or who was murdered. One of the most recognizable films produced in conjunction with Chuck Smith and Caryl Matrisciana is titled Halloween: Trick or Treat, the first in a 13-part series titled The Pagan Invasion.

Another noteworthy title is The God Makers film, released in 1982, along with its sequel The God Makers II released eleven years later in 1993.

The company produces a variety of videos, including Baby Parts For Sale, an "investigation into the multimillion-dollar-a-year baby parts trafficking industry" and stem cell research; and Halloween: Trick or Treat?, which challenges parents with a Biblical worldview "to decide whether to allow their children to participate in celebrations which glorify Pagan Occultism". The company also produced and distributes the videos The Godmakers, The Secret World of Mormonism, Freemasonry: From Darkness to Light, Death By Entertainment, Sudan: The Hidden Holocaust, The Evolution Conspiracy, The Death of Vince Foster, Cultural Marxism: The Corruption of America, Warriors of Honor: The Faith and Legacies of Robert E. Lee and Stonewall Jackson, NO OPT-OUT ALLOWED: The California Sex Ed Indoctrination, and Hillary uncensored! Banned by the Media telling the Peter F Paul story and includes Gala Hollywood Farewell Salute to President Clinton.

In 1996, Patrick Matrisciana, the founder of Jeremiah Films and an organization called Citizens for an Honest Government, produced a video called Obstruction of Justice: The Mena Connection. It claimed that two police officers with links to former Arkansas governor, Bill Clinton were implicated in drug trafficking, two murders, and a cover-up of the murders. The police officers sued Matrisciana for defamation and won an award of $598,750. In 1999, the award was overturned after Matrisciana appealed to the United States Court of Appeals for the Eighth Circuit. He won in appeals court; the three-judge panel saying: Campbell and Lane being public officials bear the burden of proving statements made by a defendant are false, and they failed to meet that standard. The judge said a public figure plaintiff must also prove malice and they did not.
