= Reed C. Durham =

American historian

Reed Connell Durham Jr. (born 1930) is a historian of the Latter Day Saint movement and former director of the Institute of Religion in Salt Lake City, Utah for the Church of Jesus Christ of Latter-day Saints (LDS Church). Durham is remembered for a controversial speech given in 1974 about Freemasonry and the Latter Day Saint movement.

== Biography ==
Durham was born in Long Beach, California. He was one of the four children of Reed C. Durham Sr. and Violet E. Cottrell. His father was a professor at Utah State University in Logan, Utah, and served as bishop in the LDS Church three times. As a young man, Reed Jr. served as an LDS missionary for two years.

Durham married Faye Lenore Davis and they began having children while he attended college in Logan.

=== Education ===
Having earlier attended school in California, Durham's higher education was in Utah. He received his M.S. from the Department of Speech at Utah State Agricultural College in 1957 (the year it became Utah State University), followed by his Ph.D. in history from Brigham Young University (BYU) in 1965, writing his dissertation on the Joseph Smith Translation of the Bible. Historian Donald Q. Cannon considered Durham's dissertation part of the "major scholarly contribution to the study of Mormon history" that occurred during the 1960s.

=== Church Educational System ===
Durham began teaching for the Church Educational System (CES) in 1955 while attending school in Logan. After receiving his master's degree, he stayed in Logan and in 1958 became associate director of the LDS Church's Institute of Religion adjacent to Utah State University. He was elected as a national vice president of Lambda Delta Sigma, the LDS fraternity, in 1959. By 1966 he was associate director of the Institute adjacent to the University of Utah in Salt Lake City, where he would serve for years as Institute Director and coordinator of Seminaries and Institutes throughout the Salt Lake Valley.

Durham has taught religion at BYU and in 1972 he was awarded the Division Faculty Teaching Award by the BYU Division of Continuing Education.

In addition to his church employment, Durham served in various ecclesiastical positions. For a time he taught Sunday school in his local ward (congregation) and he also was a member of the Sunday School General Board, planning and overseeing the church-wide Sunday School program. He also served in various auxiliaries and in two stake high councils.

=== Historical community ===
Durham was active in the historical community. In the 1960s he was involved with the Organization of American Historians. In 1970 Durham was one of several prominent LDS historians forming a committee that consulted the creation of the LDS Church Historical Department. Durham was an early supporter of Sunstone magazine, which was founded in 1974 by a former student. In 1974 Durham took a year off as Institute Director to work on a book in the church's 16-volume sesquicentennial history to be published in 1980.

In the Mormon History Association (MHA) Durham served as its eighth president, from 1973 to 1974, and second executive secretary, from 1969 to 1971. While he was president, the MHA launched the Journal of Mormon History, whose inaugural issue received criticism from some CES personnel for an article by Jan Shipps about Joseph Smith. In 1974 he delivered a controversial presidential speech to the MHA which startled the LDS historical community, causing Durham to issue a letter of clarification and withdraw from future participation in the MHA.

=== Later life ===
After his year of research ended, Durham was offered the choice of returning as the Director of the Salt Lake Institute or a promotion to area director of LDS educational programs. He turned both down so he could focus on research and full-time Institute teaching, which he did for years.

By 1991 Durham had been living in Logan, Utah where he still taught for CES. In 1994 and 1995 he taught at BYU's travel study program in Nauvoo, Illinois, and he was a service missionary at Brigham Young University–Hawaii from 1996 to 1999. In 2009 he taught a class on the Book of Mormon to single adults in Providence, near Logan.

== 1974 Nauvoo speech ==
At the Mormon History Association (MHA) conference in Nauvoo, Illinois, on April 20, 1974, Durham delivered his presidential address on the connections of Mormonism and Freemasonry, entitled "Is There No Help for the Widow's Son?". During a thunder storm that day, Durham discussed Masonic parallels with the LDS priesthood, the Masonic Enoch Legend, the occultic Jupiter Medallion attributed to Joseph Smith, and Masonic elements in Mormon temple design and ceremony. About the temple ceremony, Durham famously stated:

There is absolutely no question in my mind that the Mormon ceremony which came to be known as the Endowment, introduced by Joseph Smith to Mormon Masons initially, just a little over one month after he became a Mason, had an immediate inspiration from Masonry. This is not to suggest that no other source of inspiration could have been involved, but the similarities between the two ceremonies are so apparent and overwhelming that some dependent relationship cannot be denied.

Durham said he was attempting to raise questions and he appealed to the historical community to clarify Joseph Smith's relationship to folk magic and Masonry, rather than burying their heads "in the traditional sand".

=== Reaction ===
Jan Shipps said the speech ignited an explosion, leaving attendees in a "tension-filled aftershock". It was the only time she saw Leonard J. Arrington angry, who had worked for years to open the church archives and now feared they would be closed. The next day, the Nauvoo Visitors' Center removed a Nauvoo Temple weather vane display, which Durham had shown in slides for its Masonic symbols.

The speech seemed to support critics who wanted to discredit Mormonism. Durham's leaders were upset and he was rumored to have been disciplined. Durham denied that his church membership was ever threatened and he was even offered a promotion with CES, where he continued his career. The church had asked him "to do no more with the subject again" and "not to release information" and he declined public comment. His paper went unpublished and he ceased involvement in the MHA.

=== Letter ===
After friends and colleagues criticized his conclusions and questioned his faith, Durham circulated a letter to all participants. He stated that he had been misunderstood by not incorporating his faith into the speech. He reasserted his belief in Joseph Smith, the temple ceremonies and divine revelation.

Many saw this as an apology. LDS writer Matthew B. Brown asserted that Durham's letter admitted to limited research and insufficient skill and knowledge.

=== Legacy ===
Durham's speech became famous and made him into "a kind of pivotal figure in the Mormon (LDS) Church". It is still cited by critics of the Mormon temple rites, though his colleague Gilbert W. Scharffs believes Durham's statements have been exaggerated. While Durham didn't publish his paper, unauthorized transcripts were made and circulated as the "underground presidential address", though Durham's notes and citations were absent.

Looking back during the 1980s, Durham privately wished he had presented some material differently, noting that the evidence for the Jupiter Talisman was actually quite weak. Matthew B. Brown claimed that Durham had abandoned his speech's claims.

The speech is seen as one factors in the LDS Church's waning tolerance toward open and revisionist history during the 1970s and 1980s. It is thought to be one reason CES began to discourage its faculty from involvement in the MHA.

Some Mormon historians, such as D. Michael Quinn, built upon the speech to argue that early Mormonism was heavily influenced by folk magic. Jan Shipps believed the speech was part of Mark Hofmann's inspiration in creating the Salamander Letter, a hoax document which seemed to support Quinn's and Durham's work linking Joseph Smith's religious experiences with "magic".

== Historical approach ==
Durham was known for his unorthodox approach and research into LDS history and controversy. Scott Kenney, one of Durham's Institute students who would later found Sunstone magazine, was inspired to study theology and teach Institute because of Durham's classroom explorations of controversial issues in a historical context, which highlighted the humanistic elements of the church.

Despite his position as a local religious teacher for the church in his area, Durham was on good terms with Jerald and Sandra Tanner, well-known opponents of Mormonism, and was known to have purchased materials from them. In a 1972 speech he explained how he is motivated by the Tanner's criticisms:

I can't help but think that when they raise these issues it does something to us to have to defend... When I see something that counters what I've been taught or what I know or what I understand or what I feel, the way to counter research...unpleasant to me is not by sticking my head in the sand like an ostrich, but by more research. I may have to revamp, and knowledge sometimes is a dangerous thing. But I will revamp, and I will understand better my heritage. ...what I'm trying to say is that they have become, in a sense, catalysts to sharpen our own historical understanding. We've had to get on the stick and do some study, and do some homework that sometimes we haven't done.

In 1992, Durham remembered explaining to Sandra Tanner how he reconciled LDS historical controversies with his faith in the 1960s:

I explained to Sandra that I look at revelation as a process and that line upon line a church or a prophet or anyone for that matter can learn and improve. I told her that we all make mistakes and errors and said, 'But Sandra, you look at it differently. If you find one little mistake with a church or a prophet you believe they cannot be of God. I see a process of growing and learning. God sometimes has trouble helping us because of our limitations, not his. Oh sure, he could coerce us, but he doesn't and so we can only progress as fast as our limitations let us.'

His colleague Gilbert W. Scharffs said, "I have seldom found a man with a firmer conviction of Jesus Christ and the LDS Church. There are few in the LDS Church who have a deeper knowledge of LDS history and doctrine than Reed C. Durham, Jr."

== Works ==
Books

- Durham, Reed C. Jr.; Heath, Steven H. (1970). Succession in the Church. Salt Lake City, Utah: Bookcraft. LCCN 72119915. OCLC 69197.
- —— (1991). The Gifts of the Magi: Gold, Frankincense and Myrrh. The author. ISBN 0-916095-53-3. OCLC 31690676..

In 1972 the LDS Church planned a new sixteen-volume sesquicentennial history to be published in 1980, and Durham was commissioned to write the volume on the crossing of the Great Plains. However, these contracts were all canceled in 1981 and Durham's volume was never published, though he did write an article on the subject for the Encyclopedia of Mormonism and two journal articles on the Mormon pioneer sojourn in Iowa.

Papers

- Durham, Reed C. Jr. (1957), The Use of Choral Reading in the Various Programs of the Church of Jesus Christ of Latter-day Saints, Master's thesis, Logan: Department of Speech, Utah State Agricultural College.
- —— (1965), A History of Joseph Smith's Revision of the Bible, Ph.D. thesis, Provo, Utah: Department of Graduate Studies in Religious Instruction, Brigham Young University.
- —— (1966), The Great and Abominable Church (Pamphlet), Institute of Religion, p. 12.
- —— (1971), Various Accounts of the Election-Day Battle at Gallatin, Missouri on August 6, 1839—Arranged in Chronological Order, Salt Lake City, Utah: Salt Lake Institute of Religion.
- —— (1971), Revelation and Scripture: A Collection of Significant Statements. Unpublished manuscript in the BYU Harold B. Lee Library.
- —— (April 20, 1974), Is There No Help for the Widow's Son?, Nauvoo, Illinois: Mormon History Association Convention. Presidential Address. (Unauthorized publication by Mervin B. Hogan as "An Underground Presidential Address".)
- —— (1974), To Whom It May Concern. Privately circulated letter.
- —— (1980), Some Recent Historical and Archaeological Evidences for the Book of Mormon, R. C. Durham.

Articles

- Durham, Reed C. Jr. (Autumn 1966). "[Book review of] The Everlasting Spires: A Story of the Salt Lake Temple, by Wallace Alan Raynor". Dialogue: A Journal of Mormon Thought. 1 (3): 169–170. doi:10.2307/45223833. JSTOR 45223833.
- —— (July 1967). "... Mary Was Espoused to Joseph ...". The Instructor: 265.
- —— (Spring 1968). "[Book review of] Joseph Smith and the Restoration, by Ivan J. Barrett". BYU Studies. 8 (3): 342–345.
- —— (Summer 1970). "Joseph Smith's Own Story of a Serious Childhood Illness". BYU Studies. 10 (4): 480–482.
- —— (1972). "Joseph Smith's First Vision Analyzed--Different Accounts". Second Annual Henry Eyring Speakers' Series. Tucson, AZ: Tucson Institute of Religion.
- —— (May 1972). "And Blossom as the Rose". Ensign: 74.
- —— (Autumn 1972). "The Election Day Battle at Gallatin". BYU Studies. 13 (1): 36–61.
- —— (May 1973). "Revelation: The Plainest Book Ever Written". New Era: 21.
- —— (September 1973). "Questions and Answers: What is the Hosanna Shout?". New Era: 14–15.
- —— (September 1975). "Questions and Answers: What is the mantle of the prophet?". New Era: 15–16.
- —— (Fall 1981). "The Iowa Experience: A Blessing in Disguise". BYU Studies. 21 (4): 463–474. Also printed in Pioneer (1996)
- —— (1992). "Nauvoo Expositor". In Ludlow, Daniel H (ed.). Encyclopedia of Mormonism. New York: Macmillan Publishing. ISBN 0-02-879602-0. OCLC 24502140.
- —— (1992). "Times and Seasons". In Ludlow, Daniel H (ed.). Encyclopedia of Mormonism. New York: Macmillan Publishing. ISBN 0-02-879602-0. OCLC 24502140.
- —— (1992). "Westward Migration: Planning and Prophecy". In Ludlow, Daniel H (ed.). Encyclopedia of Mormonism. New York: Macmillan Publishing. ISBN 0-02-879602-0. OCLC 24502140.
- —— (Spring 1996). "The Iowa Experience: A Blessing in Disguise?". Pioneer: 10–12, 14. Also published in: BYU Studies 21:4 (Fall 1981)
- Backman, Milton V. Jr.; Durham, Reed C. Jr.; Tate, Charles D. (Fall 1996). "The Nauvoo Experience, 1844-1846". Dispatch. Illinois State Historical Society: 12–13.
- Durham, Reed C. Jr. (1997). "The Iowa experience: a blessing in disguise?". Pioneer: Sesquicentennial, 1847, 1997. Midvale, Utah: National Society of the Sons of Utah Pioneers. OCLC 37448774. Also printed in BYU Studies 21:4 (Fall 1981)
