= Mormonism: Shadow or Reality? =

1963 book by Jerald and Sandra Tanner

- Author: Jerald and Sandra Tanner
- Language: English
- Subject: Criticism of Mormonism
- Publisher: Utah Lighthouse Ministry
- Publication date: 1963
- Publication place: United States
- Media type: Print (Hardcover, Paperback)
- Pages: 576 pp (1987 edition)
- ISBN: 978-99930-74-43-4

Mormonism: Shadow or Reality? is a 1963 book by Jerald and Sandra Tanner that is critical of the Church of Jesus Christ of Latter-day Saints (LDS Church).

== Description ==
The book was originally entitled Mormonism: A Study of Mormon History and Doctrine and has been reprinted five times since (the latest edition was in 2008). The book is a long, densely written work full of copies of early Latter Day Saints documents accompanied by commentary. It has subsequently been revised and was the basis for the Tanners' more readable later book, The Changing World of Mormonism.

Mormonism: Shadow or Reality? deals with many subjects in a critical view, including the Book of Mormon and other LDS scriptures, Joseph Smith's life, alleged false prophecies, the missionary system, controversial historical incidents and subjects (Mountain Meadows massacre, wealth, the priesthood ban, polygamy) and many doctrines and practices (Adam-God doctrine, temple ceremonies).

== Critical reception ==
Mormon book dealer Curt Bench listed this book among 50 important books on Mormonism in its first 150 years, including it as one of six "anti-Mormon" titles on the list.

The book has been described by Dean Helland of Oral Roberts University as "the heavyweight of all books on Mormonism". However, D. Michael Quinn, a Mormon historian at Brigham Young University, took issue with the Tanners' work, calling it a "distorted view of Mormonism". Danel W. Bachman, of the Foundation for Apologetic Information & Research, a group consisting of Mormons who seek to defend their faith, concluded that he found in the book "propagandistic techniques and instances of egregious misuse of documentary evidence".

== Cultural impact ==
The book can be seen in episode six of the Hulu television series Under the Banner of Heaven, being read by the show's protagonist Pyre (Andrew Garfield) in Episode 6, "Revelation" at 58:53. In this series, the book was portrayed as being taboo to read for LDS members and well-known in its appearance. One character, Allen, hid its recognizable bright red cover under a textbook jacket to conceal it from his wife; the aforementioned main character's wife is visibly upset when she accidentally catches him reading it in their family car in the driveway in the middle of the night.
