= Anti-Mormonism =

Hostility towards the Latter Day Saint movement

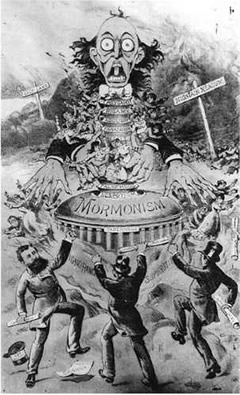
An anti-Mormon political cartoon from the late 19th century.

Anti-Mormonism refers to individuals, literature, and media that are opposed to the beliefs, adherents, or institutions of Mormonism and the Latter Day Saint movement as a whole. It may include hostility, prejudice, discrimination, persecution, and violent physical attacks targeting Mormons and the Latter Day Saint movement.

Opposition to Mormonism began before the first Latter Day Saint church was established in 1830 and continues to the present day. The most vocal and strident opposition occurred during the 19th century, particularly the forced expulsion from Missouri following the 1838 Mormon War, during the Utah War of the 1850s, and in the second half of the century when the practice of polygamy in Utah Territory was widely condemned by the majority of Americans. Opponents of polygamy believed that polygamy forced wives into submission to their husbands and some described polygamy as a form of slavery.

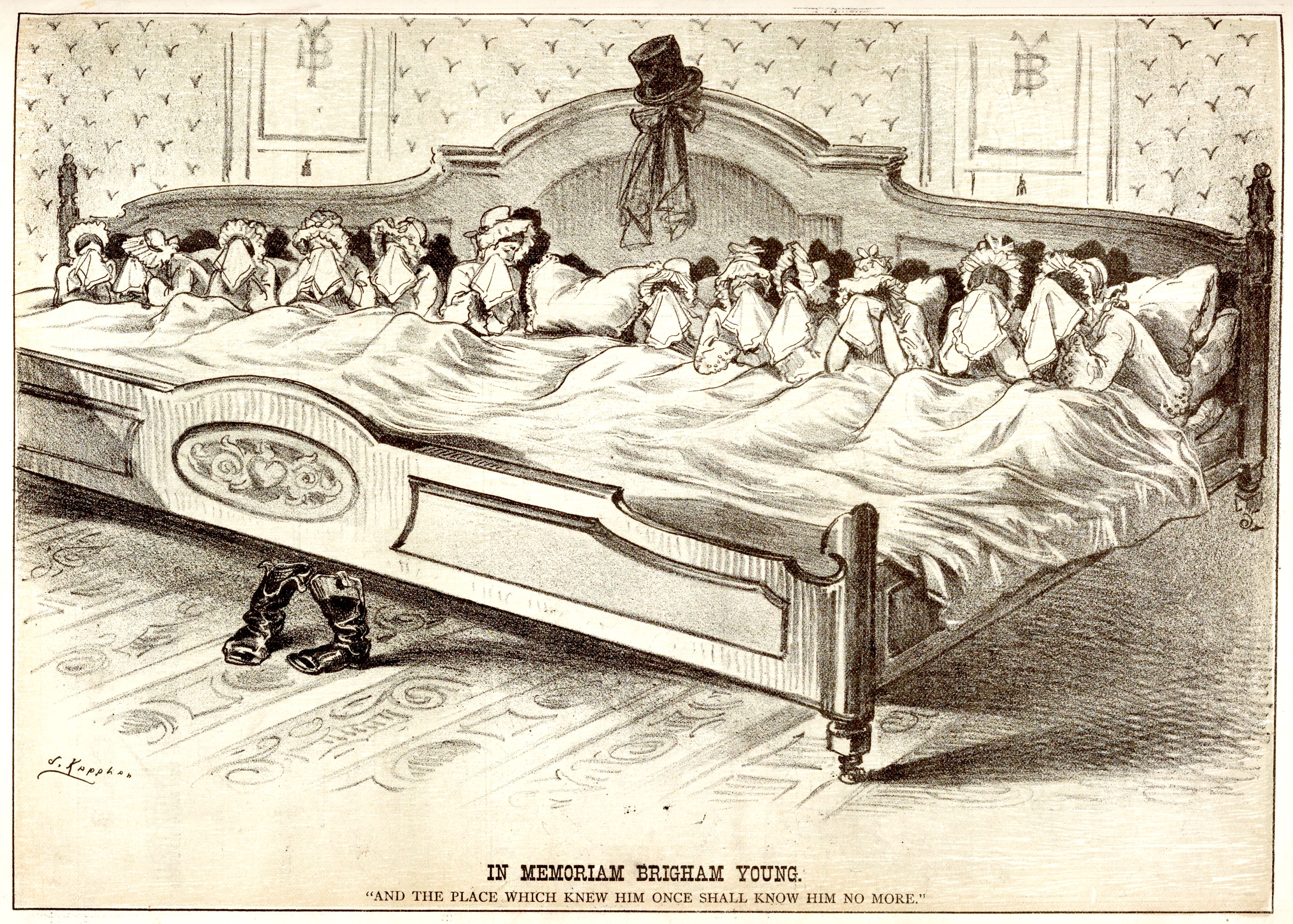
A caricature of Brigham Young's wives, published in Puck following his death in 1877.

Modern-day opposition generally takes the form of websites, podcasts, videos or other media primarily criticizing the LDS Church, or protests at its large gatherings, such as its semiannual general conference, outside of Latter-day Saint pageants, or at events surrounding the construction of new temples. Scholars hold that the church's historical claims are false, while some non-Latter-day Saint Christians teach that the faith is non-Christian. Critics claim that it is a religion based on fraud or deceit on the part of its past and present leaders.

Most Americans accept Mormonism as a valid faith, and in 2012, the US presidential candidate Mitt Romney's membership in the LDS Church was described as "non-issue" in that year's election. Despite this, the percentage of Americans who stated that they would be less likely to vote for a Mormon president had increased from 25% in 2008 (Romney's first candidacy) to 34% in 2012.

The FBI began tracking anti-Mormon hate crimes in the United States in 2015 and have noted an increase in incidents over time (through 2019).

== Origin ==
The term, "anti-Mormon" first appears in the historical record in 1833 by the Louisville (Kentucky) Daily Herald in an article, "The Mormons and the Anti-Mormons" (the article was also the first known to label believers in the Book of Mormon as "Mormons"). In 1841, it was revealed that an Anti-Mormon Almanac would be published.

Dozens of publications had strongly criticized Mormonism since its inception. In 1834, Eber D. Howe published his book Mormonism Unvailed. The Latter Day Saints initially labeled such publications "anti-Christian", but the publication of the Almanac and the subsequent formation of an "Anti-Mormon Party" in Illinois heralded a shift in terminology. "Anti-Mormon" became a common self-designation for those opposed to the religion.

Today, the term is primarily used as a descriptor for persons and publications active in their opposition to the LDS Church, although its precise scope has been the subject of some debate. Some use it to describe all thought perceived as critical of the LDS Church. Siding with the latter, less-inclusive understanding of the term, Latter-day Saint scholar William O. Nelson suggests in the Encyclopedia of Mormonism that the term includes "any hostile or polemic opposition to Mormonism or to the Latter-day Saints, such as maligning Joseph Smith, his successors, or the doctrines or practices of the Church. Though sometimes well-intended, anti-Mormon publications have often taken the form of invective, falsehood, demeaning caricature, prejudice, or legal harassment, leading to both verbal and physical assault."

=== Reaction ===
Many of those who have been labeled "anti-Mormon" object to the designation, arguing that the term implies that disagreement or criticism of Mormonism stems from some inherent "anti-Mormon" prejudice, rather than being part of a legitimate factual or religious debate.

Even some members of the LDS Church who write negatively about it have had their writings labeled anti-Mormon. Ex-members who write about the LDS Church are likewise frequently labeled anti-Mormon, even when their writings are not inflammatory in nature. The debate on who is "anti-Mormon" frequently arises in Mormon discussions of authors and sources.

Stephen Cannon has argued that use of the label is a "campaign by Latter-day Saints to disavow the facts presented by simply labeling the source as 'anti-Mormon'". Critics of the term also claim that Mormon authors promote the ideal of a promised heavenly reward for enduring persecution for one's beliefs.

Those individuals and groups who challenge Mormonism, particularly those who approach the challenge from an evangelical Christian perspective, would generally sustain that they do, in fact, have the best interests of the Mormon at heart.

== History ==
=== Opposition to Mormonism in Smith's lifetime ===
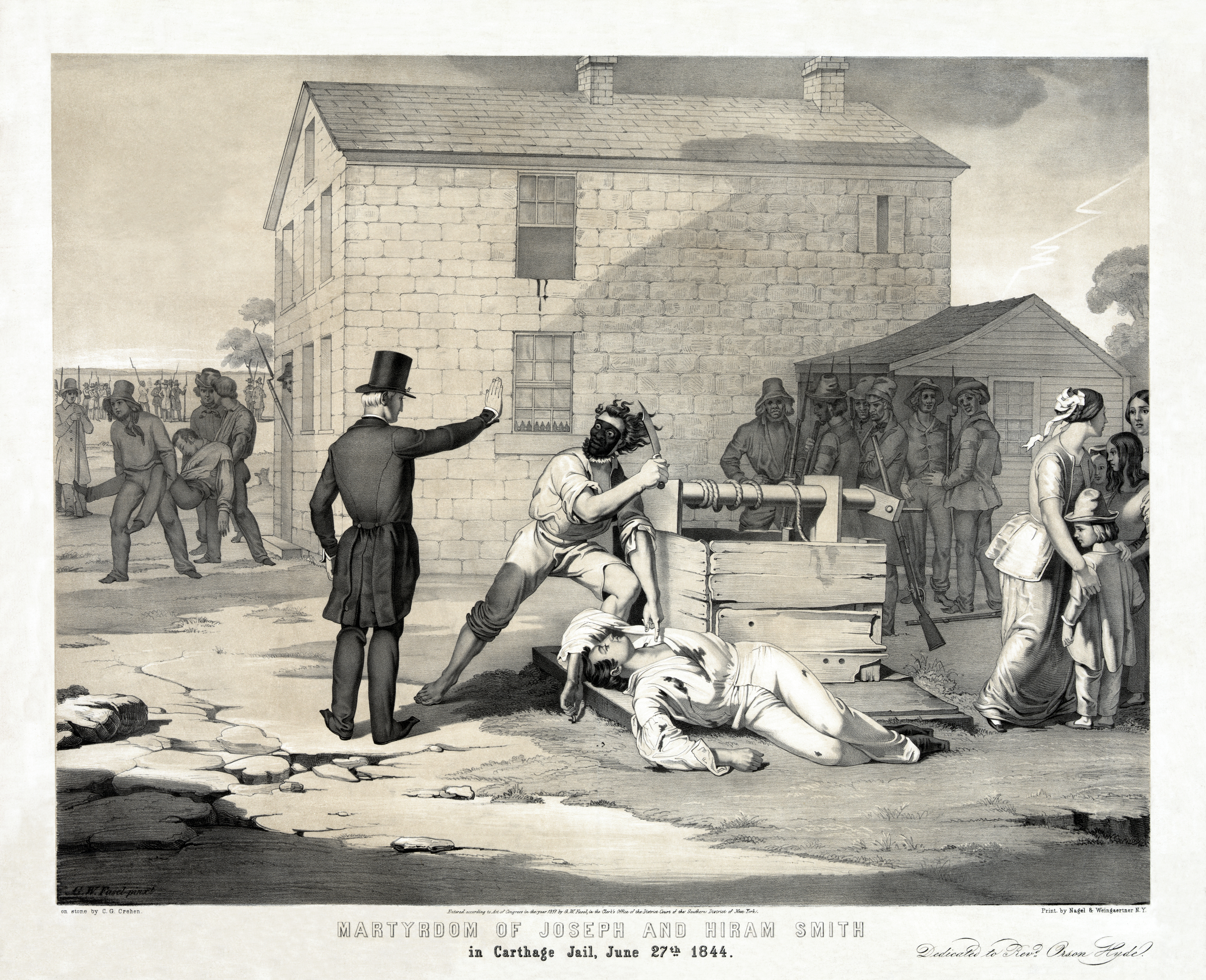
An 1851 lithograph of Smith's body about to be mutilated (Library of Congress).

The Latter Day Saint movement—its devotees being known as Mormons—arose in western New York, the state in which its founder, Joseph Smith, was raised, during a period of Christian revivalism in the early 19th century. Smith claimed to have had visions involving God, Jesus, and angelic Native American prophets. His claims were often not received well by those in the community in which he lived, which is evident in the following excerpt from Smith's account of LDS Church history:

... One of the Methodist preachers ... treated my communication ... with great contempt, saying it was all of the devil, that there were no such things as visions or revelations in these days; that all such things had ceased with the apostles, and that there would never be any more of them. I soon found, however, that my telling the story had excited a great deal of prejudice against me among professors of religion, and was the cause of great persecution, which continued to increase; and though I was an obscure boy, only between fourteen and fifteen years of age, and my circumstances in life such as to make a boy of no consequence in the world, yet men of high standing would take notice sufficient to excite the public mind against me, and create a bitter persecution; and this was common among all the sects—all united to persecute me.

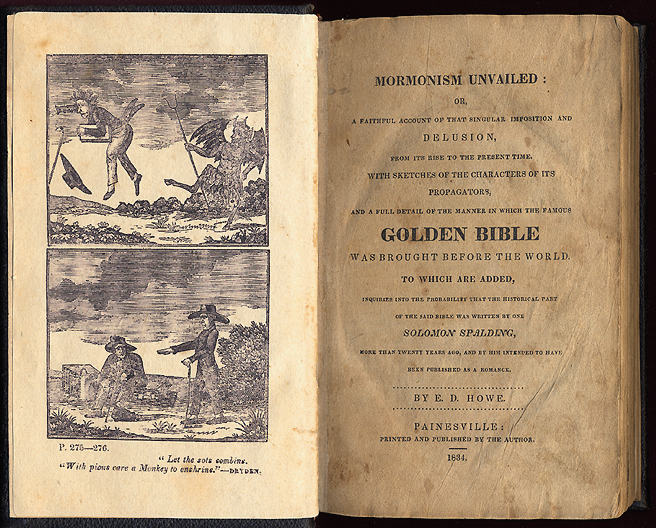
Title page of one of the earliest anti-Mormon publications, E. D. Howe's Mormonism Unvailed: Or, A Faithful Account of that Singular Imposition and Delusion, from its Rise to the Present Time (1834), which claimed that the Book of Mormon was written by Solomon Spalding.

In New York and Pennsylvania, anti-Mormonism concerned whether Smith had factually encountered the so-called golden plates; whether Smith had genuine visions (at least ones of theological import); Smith's treasure-digging episodes; and his alleged occult practices. In Ohio, anti-Mormons focused on the ill-fated banking efforts of the Kirtland Safety Society and other failed economic experiments, including the United Order.

In Missouri, once the major gathering place of Latter-day Saints, members tended to vote in elections as a voting bloc, wielding "considerable political and economic influence," often unseating local political leadership and earning long-lasting enmity in the sometimes hard-drinking, hard-living frontier communities. The apparent differences between Latter-day Saints and the broader community culminated in hostilities and the eventual issuing of an executive order—later becoming known as "the Extermination Order" by the LDS Church—by Missouri governor Lilburn Boggs, which declared "the Mormons must be treated as enemies, and must be exterminated or driven from the State." Three days later, on October 30, 1838, a renegade militia unit attacked a Mormon settlement in Hawn's Mill, resulting in the death of 18 Mormons and no militiamen in the eponymously named Hawn's Mill massacre. The so-called Extermination Order was not formally rescinded until 1976.

In Nauvoo, Illinois, persecutions were often based on the tendency of Mormons to "dominate community, economic, and political life wherever they resided," writes Drew VandeCreek of Northern Illinois University. The city of Nauvoo had become the largest in Illinois, and its city council was primarily composed of Latter-day Saints; the Nauvoo Legion—a militia composed of Mormons from the city—had grown to a quarter of the size of the U.S. Army. Other issues of contention included the LDS Church’s doctrine on polygamy; freedom of speech; Smith's anti-slavery views expressed during his presidential campaign; and the LDS Church's doctrines on exaltation and human deification. After the destruction of the Nauvoo Expositor printing press and institution of martial law, Joseph Smith was arrested on charges of treason against the State of Illinois and incarcerated in Carthage Jail, where he was murdered by an anti-Mormon mob on June 27, 1844. Anti-Mormon persecution became so severe in Illinois that most of the residents of Nauvoo fled across the Mississippi River in February 1846.

In 1847, Mormons established a community hundreds of miles away in the Salt Lake Valley in Utah. Beginning in 1849, every federally appointed official left Utah under duress from Mormon pioneers. In 1857, President James Buchanan determined that the Mormons in the territory were rebelling against the United States government. In response, Buchanan deployed one-third of the US Army to Utah in 1857 to engage in what became the Utah War.

=== Early publications ===
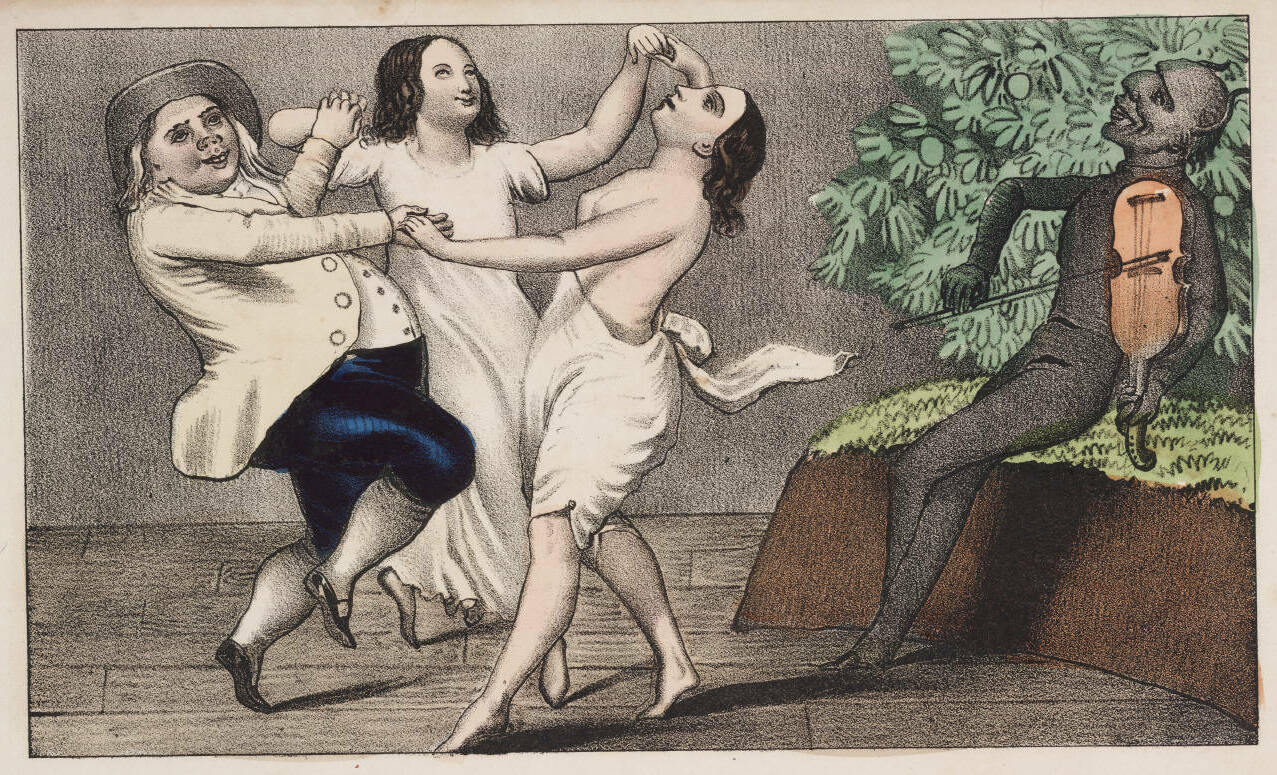
A Mormon and his wives dancing to the Devil's tune (1850)

Much of the anti-Mormon sentiment during that period was expressed in non-Mormon publications, which appeared very early in LDS Church history. In his 2005 biography of Joseph Smith, Richard Lyman Bushman cites four 1838 pamphlets as anti-Mormon: Mormonism Exposed by Sunderland, Mormonism Exposed by Bacheler, Antidote to Mormonism by M'Chesney, and Exposure of Mormonism by Livesey.

The first was authored by Origen Bacheler, who had no direct contact with any Latter-day Saints. It included a debate between him and Parley P. Pratt, though Pratt's side was omitted. Bushman notes that the author's rhetoric was similar to that of many other polemicists of his era, offering insight into the type of material viewed as anti-Mormon. The pamphlet described Joseph Smith as a "blockhead," a "juggling, money-digging, fortune-telling impostor," and, along with the Eight Witnesses to the Book of Mormon, as "perhaps the most infamous liars and impostors that ever breathed. ... By their deception and lies, they swindle them out of their property, disturb social order and the public peace, excite a spirit of ferocity and murder, and lead multitudes astray on the subject in which they have the deepest interest." He expressed outrage at "the miscreants who are battening on the ignorance and credulity of those upon whom they can successfully play off this imposture." He called the Book of Mormon "the most gross, the most ridiculous, the most imbecile, the most contemptible concern, that was ever attempted to be palmed off upon society as a revelation." He believed the religion "can be viewed in no other light than that of monstrous public nuisances, that ought forthwith to be abated" and that the Mormons were "the most vile, the most impudent, the most impious, knot of charlatans and cheat with which any community was ever disgraced and cursed." Antidote to Mormonism describes Mormons as "miserable enemies of both God and man—engines of death and hell." M'Chesney described combat with them as being "desperate, the battle is one of extermination." Bushman described the characteristics of these anti-Mormonism materials as sensationalizing actuality:

The critics' writings largely controlled the reading public's image of [Joseph Smith] for the next century, with unfortunate results for biographers. The sharp caricature of "Joe Smith" as [a] fraud and con man blotted out the actual person. He was a combination of knave and blockhead. No one had to explain what motives drove him. He was a fixed type, the confidence man, well known in the literature of antebellum America. Americans knew all about these insidious scoundrels who undermined social order and ruined the lives of their unsuspecting victims. Joseph Smith became the worst of the type—a religious fraud who preyed upon the sacred yearnings of the human soul.

British author Arthur Conan Doyle's A Study in Scarlet (1887), the novel in which the famous fictional detective Sherlock Holmes made his first appearance, includes a very negative depiction of the early Mormon community in Utah after its migration westwards and the foundation of Salt Lake City. Mormons are presented as violent, rigidly intolerant, and corrupt, systematically terrorizing both members of the LDS Church and non-Mormon neighbors as well as forcing polygamous marriage on Mormon girls against their will.

Later in his career, Conan Doyle apologized to the Mormons for his depiction of their religion. During a 1923 tour of the United States, Doyle was invited to speak at the LDS Church's Salt Lake Tabernacle; while some individual Mormons remained deeply upset over the negative depiction, in general, the Mormons present received him warmly.

== Forms ==
Vehement opposition to the LDS Church comes from individuals and groups associated with the Christian countercult movement, which is mostly an evangelical Christian phenomenon. In the 21st century, opposition to Mormonism has become frequent among secular groups.

=== Religious anti-Mormonism ===
Among those with religious motives, Daniel C. Peterson has identified two major streams of modern anti-Mormon thought. The first is "traditional anti-Mormonism", typified by Wesley P. Walters and Walter Ralston Martin. Anti-Mormons in this category generally try to explain Mormonism in naturalistic terms. They appeal to "Joseph Smith's environment and his (wicked or pathological) character, perhaps assisted by a co-conspirator or two", as a sufficient explanation for Mormon origins.

"New Age anti-Mormonism", according to Peterson, "is quite different. It admits the presence of supernatural events in the founding events of the Church of Jesus Christ of Latter-day Saints and is quite willing to acknowledge continuous supernatural influence in the life of the Church today." However, "unlike faithful Latter-day Saints, New Age anti-Mormons see the supernatural agents involved in the founding and progress of the Church as demonic, occultic, diabolical, luciferian."

This "New Age anti-Mormon" grouping includes Ed Decker, Loftes Tryk, James R. Spencer, and many others. According to Introvigne, New Age anti-Mormonism emerged in the 1980s largely as a result of the rise of third-wave Pentecostalism and its emphasis on spiritual warfare. While some may believe that Satan was indirectly involved in the founding of the LDS Church, they place little emphasis on his role. For them, naturalistic and historical explanations are always preferable to supernatural ones.

Walter Ralston Martin, founder of the Christian Research Institute, was another traditional anti-Mormon. Martin was more controversial and contemptuous than others noted here. He portrayed Mormons as deceivers who "pose as Christians," calling them "anti-Christian" and "a cult infiltration." Martin also claimed that Mormons secretly harbor a "deep contempt for Christians," and accused them of being egomaniacs and "cultists".

New Age anti-Mormons have generated considerably more controversy than traditional anti-Mormons. The most prominent of their number, Ed Decker, produced The God Makers and The God Makers II, and wrote books by the same name. The film is generally considered acerbic and misleading, and has provoked bomb threats against LDS meetinghouses and death threats against members. In other publications, Decker has asserted that the literal source of Mormonism is Satan, that its religious symbolism is satanic in nature, and that it is a political conspiracy by nature.

==== Protests ====
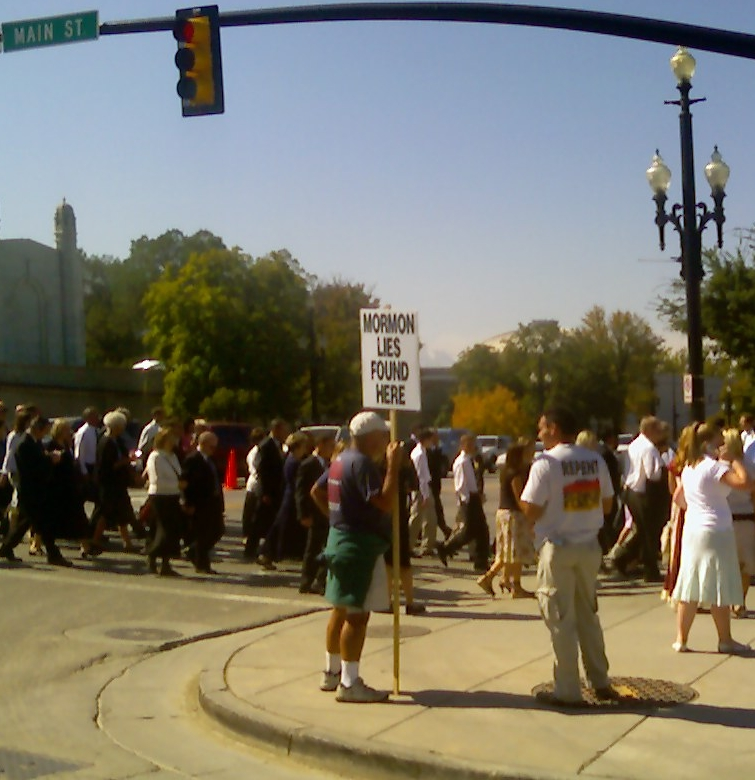
Protesters outside the site of the LDS general conference in 2006

Protesters have been visible as "street preachers" at LDS General Conferences, outside of LDS pageants, and Mormon temples. At the Sacramento California Temple, for example, protesters distributed pamphlets to visitors who came to take a guided tour. They also held up signs directing people to websites critical of the LDS Church. Notably, protesters also made an appearance at the 2002 Winter Olympics in Salt Lake City. One group that actively organizes peaceful protests is the Mormonism Research Ministry, a non-profit organization that insists its activities are not "anti-Mormon".

Some other individuals have been seen throwing copies of the Book of Mormon on the ground, stepping on them, and portraying using temple garments, which Latter-day Saints hold sacred, as toilet tissue, and other similarly offensive actions. However, nearly every evangelical ministry, including those that actively challenge the truth claims of Mormonism, vehemently condemns this offensive and belligerent behavior and further objects to being placed in the same category as those few who engage in such behavior. As a result of organized protests at Mormon events, a number of Latter-day Saints, and even non-Mormons, have begun to counter-demonstrate at events (by singing hymns, for example).

=== Secular anti-Mormonism ===
Opposition to Mormonism has been more prominent in the 21st century from atheist perspectives. Richard Dawkins, Bill Maher, and John Dehlin are among the more prominent individuals who have used media appearances or podcasts to oppose the institutional LDS Church and its doctrines and policies. The LDS Church has been associated by some members of the left as being part of the Christian right, leading to additional dissatisfaction, and the church's active stance against same-sex marriage has led to criticism from LGBT groups and occasional destruction/defacement of property. The Republican Party's nomination of Mormon candidate Mitt Romney for president in 2012 may have increased anti-Mormonism on the left, with the percentage of liberals stating they would not vote for a Mormon for president skyrocketing from 21% in 2007 to 40% in 2012, surpassing even evangelical Christians.

==== Legal ====
In 1922, the Kingdom of Tonga – then a British protectorate – enacted a new Passport Act which banned all members of the LDS Church from entering Tonga. The Legislative Assembly of Tonga implemented the ban in response to increased missionary activity which conflicted with the state-sanctioned Free Church of Tonga. Offenders were liable to be fined or deported, however existing missionaries were allowed to remain. The ban, widely referred to as the Exclusion Law, was repealed in 1924 following the intervention of the U.S. government.

In March 2014, a court case was brought against LDS Church president Thomas S. Monson in the United Kingdom. Monson was accused by disaffected member Tom Phillips of breaching the Fraud Act 2006. The summons alleged that two men were induced to pay tithes to the LDS Church by objectively untrue church teachings. The allegedly untrue teachings included that Joseph Smith translated the Book of Mormon from ancient golden plates (and that the event was factual), and that Native Americans are descended from Israelites who left Jerusalem in 600 BCE. The court case was tossed out before trial. A court judge called it an "abuse" of court process.

== Violence ==
Tangible acts of violence against Latter-day Saints are considerably less common in the United States today than they were in the 19th century. The first significant violent persecution occurred in the early 1830s in Missouri. Mormons tended to vote as a bloc there, wielding "considerable political and economic influence," often unseating local political leadership and earning long-lasting enmity in the frontier communities. These differences culminated in the Missouri Mormon War and the eventual issuing of an executive order (since called the extermination order within the LDS community) by Missouri governor Lilburn Boggs, which declared that "the Mormons must be treated as enemies, and must be exterminated or driven from the State." Three days later, a renegade militia unit attacked a Mormon settlement at Haun's Mill, resulting in the death of 18 Mormons and no militiamen. The extermination order was not formally rescinded until 1976.

After the destruction of the press of the Nauvoo Expositor in Nauvoo, Illinois, Joseph Smith was arrested and incarcerated in Carthage Jail where he was killed by a mob on June 27, 1844. The persecution in Illinois became so severe that most of the residents of Nauvoo fled across the Mississippi River in February 1846.

Even after Mormons established a community hundreds of miles away in the Salt Lake Valley in 1847, anti-Mormon activists in Utah Territory convinced U.S. President James Buchanan that the Mormons in the territory were rebelling against the United States; critics pointed to plural marriage as a sign of the rebellion. In response, President Buchanan sent one-third of the American standing army in 1857 to Utah in what is known as the Utah War.

More recent persecution against Mormons in the U.S. has occasionally taken the shape of acts of vandalism against church property. At an LDS Church building in Orangevale, Sacramento County, vandals spray painted "No on 8" and "No on Prop 8" on the front sign and sidewalk. An affiliate group of the radical Trans/Queer organization Bash Back!, claims credit for pouring glue into the locks of an LDS Church building and spray painting on its walls. An internet posting signed by Bash Back!'s Olympia chapter said: "The Mormon church ... needs to be confronted, attacked, subverted and destroyed." According to the Chicago Tribune, the acts of vandalism against the LDS Church appear to be in retaliation for support of Proposition 8. Police reported that nine church buildings were also damaged in Utah that month. The Anti-Defamation League released a statement condemning the "defacement and destruction of property."

In November 2008, the United States Postal Service delivered envelopes containing white powder to two LDS Church temples—the Los Angeles California Temple and the Salt Lake Temple—and to the Knights of Columbus' national headquarters in New Haven, Connecticut, prompting a hazardous materials response and a federal domestic terrorism investigation. The LDS Church blamed opponents of the marriage ban for sending the hoax mailings, while a group that also supported the measure condemned "acts of domestic terrorism against our supporters." LGBT rights groups, such as Equality Utah and Equality California, have spoken out against the use of violence in protests, and note that the source of the "white powder" mailings has not been determined.

In Latin America, opposition to Mormonism has taken a deadlier form. In May 1989, members of a terrorist organization called the Zarate Willka Armed Forces of Liberation murdered two Mormon missionaries in La Paz, Bolivia. Another Bolivian terrorist group, the Tupac Katari Guerrilla Army, claimed responsibility for two attacks against Mormon chapels. The Lautaro Youth Movement in Chile conducted 27 small-scale bombings against LDS meetinghouses in 1992.

On Sunday, September 28, 2025, a LDS meetinghouse in Grand Blanc Michigan, was attacked during the congregation's Sunday service. The perpetrator, 40-year-old Thomas Jacob Sanford, rammed his pickup truck into the front wall of the chapel, then exited the vehicle and opened fire on the congregation with an assault rifle. At some point Sanford set the building on fire, likely using gasoline as an accelerant, which destroyed most of it. In all four church members were killed and eight injured. Federal Bureau of Investigation director Kash Patel said that Sanford reportedly "hated people of the Mormon faith" and a Burton City Council candidate told reporters that Sanford called LDS Church members "the antichrist" when the two had met the week before the attack.

== Responses ==
=== Official ===
Although a position on anti-Mormonism is not part of the official doctrine of the LDS Church, it has been mentioned specifically in a number of general conference talks made by church general authorities.

Marvin J. Ashton, speaking as a member of the Quorum of the Twelve Apostles, began a fall 1982 conference by relating an experience he had with a protester outside Temple Square. He went on to declare "[t]o the world, and especially to members of The Church of Jesus Christ of Latter-day Saints" that "there is no time for contention," and encouraged "all our members to refuse to become anti-anti-Mormon. In the wise words of old, can we 'live and let live'?"

Carlos E. Asay of the Presidency of the First Quorum of the Seventy spoke in the fall 1981 conference concerning opposition to the LDS Church. He describes "Lucifer" as the source of at least some anti-Mormonism and apostate groups, relates an experience of a Mormon convert being excommunicated and encourages the avoidance of "those who would tear down your faith.”

A passage from an early Mormon epistle addresses a claimed tendency of ex-Mormons to criticize the church of which they are no longer a part:

[A]postates after turning from the faith of Christ ... have sooner or later fallen into the snares of the wicked one, and have been left destitute of the Spirit of God, to manifest their wickedness in the eyes of multitudes. From apostates the faithful have received the severest persecutions ... "When once that light which was in them is taken from them, they become as much darkened as they were previously enlightened, and then, no marvel, if all their power should be enlisted against the truth," and they, Judas like, seek the destruction of those who were their greatest benefactors.

In 1985, Vaughn J Featherstone, a member of the First Quorum of the Seventy of the LDS Church, addressed students at the church-owned Brigham Young University, calling anti-Mormon material "theological pornography that is damaging to the spirit."

In 1992, the church issued a press release describing their scriptural mandate to "[gather] up a knowledge of all the facts, and sufferings and abuses put upon them. ... And perhaps a committee can be appointed to find out these things, and to take statements and affidavits; and also to gather up the libelous publications that are afloat ...." The Strengthening Church Members Committee was appointed by the First Presidency to comply with this scripture and to serve as a resource to local church leaders to assist their members who have questions. The committee consisted at that time of Russell M. Nelson and James E. Faust.

=== Apologetic ===
Mormon apologetics and members vary both in their perception of criticism and opposition, as well as what they see as falling under the umbrella of anti-Mormonism. According to Hugh Nibley, a noted Mormon apologist, some of those who leave the LDS Church "become sometimes feverishly active, determined to prove to the world and themselves that it is a fraud after all," while others "hold no rancor and even retain a sentimental affection for the Church—they just don't believe the gospel." However, neither group, Nibley affirms, can ever "leave it alone. ... It haunts them all the days of their life. No one who has ever had a testimony ever forgets or denies that he once did have it—that it was something that really happened to him."

Although some Mormons avoid anti-Mormon material, others analyze and criticize it, such as William J. Hamblin, who addresses anti-Mormon attacks on the geography and archeology of the Book of Mormon in "Basic Methodological Problems with the Anti-Mormon Approach to the Geography and Archaeology of the Book of Mormon."

Some prominent LDS Church apologists believe that the opposition from anti-Mormonism can be beneficial to Mormonism. As Hugh Nibley expressed it, "We need more anti-Mormon books. They keep us on our toes." Orson Pratt also seemed to invite criticism when he said:

Convince us of our errors of doctrine, if we have any, by reason, by logical arguments, or by the word of God, and we will be ever grateful for the information, and you will ever have the pleasing reflection that you have been instruments in the hands of God of redeeming your fellow beings from the darkness which you may see enveloping their minds.

=== Evangelical ===
Regarding the subject of Christian anti-Mormonism, Richard Mouw (President of the Fuller Theological Seminary) stated in 2004 at the Salt Lake Tabernacle in Salt Lake City,

I am now convinced that we ... have often seriously misrepresented the beliefs and practices of the Mormon community. Indeed, let me state it bluntly to the LDS folks here this evening: we have sinned against you. The God of the Scriptures makes it clear that it is a terrible thing to bear false witness against our neighbors, and we have been guilty of that sort of transgression in things we have said about you. We have told you what you believe without making a sincere effort first of all to ask you what you believe...Indeed, we have even on occasion demonized you, weaving conspiracy theories about what the LDS community is 'really' trying to accomplish in the world.

Mouw is not the only Christian calling for moderation. Similar pleas have been issued by David Rowe, Carl Mosser, Francis J. Beckwith, Paul Owen, Craig Blomberg, and others. Some church and parachurch groups have also made efforts to repair relations with the Mormons. In the 1980s, Jerry Falwell's Moral Majority "took some small steps toward Evangelical-Mormon cooperation for a shared social, political, and ethical agenda". In or around 2000, a Pentecostal congregation in Provo, Utah held a public ceremony of repentance for its negative attitudes and actions toward the Latter-day Saint community.

Some traditional Christian churches and ministries, however, have expressed varying degrees of concern about the movement to abandon what they consider to be valid and cogent challenges to Mormon doctrine and teaching for the sake of "peaceful co-existence", and yet at the same time do not wish to be categorized with the fringe Christian elements that seek to be openly disruptive and antagonistic toward the LDS community.

=== Political ===
In 2011, Rick Santorum was asked if Jon Huntsman and Mitt Romney would have problems in the 2012 presidential election cycle as Mormons. Santorum answered, "I hope not. ... I hope that people will look at the qualities of candidates and look at what they believe and what they're for and look [at] their records and then make a decision."

Then-Vice President Joe Biden said, in a long response to a University of Pittsburgh student's question about how his own religious faith affected his philosophy of government:

I find it preposterous that in 2011 we're debating whether or not a man is qualified or worthy of your vote based on whether or not his religion ... is a disqualifying provision. ... It is not. It is embarrassing and we should be ashamed, anyone who thinks that way.

== See also ==
- American Party (Utah)
- Anti-Christian sentiment
  - Anti-Catholicism
  - Anti-Protestantism
  - Persecution of Eastern Orthodox Christians
  - Persecution of Jehovah's Witnesses
- A Victim of the Mormons
- Criticism of LDS Church
- Ex-Mormon
- Freedom of religion in the United States
- Latter Day Saint martyrs
- Latter Day Saints in popular culture
- Mormonism and Christianity
- Phrenology and the Latter Day Saint Movement
- Portrayal of Mormons in comics
- Veterans on Patrol
