= H. Michael Marquardt =

Historian of the Latter Day Saint movement

- Born: Henry Michael Marquardt; July 1944
- Occupation(s): Researcher and author
- Website: user.xmission.com/~research/central/index.htm

H. Michael Marquardt (born July 1944) is an independent researcher of the Latter Day Saint movement.

== Contributions ==
Marquardt is a member of a community of scholars critical of the Latter Day Saint Movement. In 1974, he published for the first time an 1831 Joseph Smith revelation that in time Mormons would intermarry with Lamanites to create a white, just race. In 1979, he was the first to publish the 1835-1836 Joseph Smith diary.

=== Book of Abraham ===
Marquardt was a frequent collaborator with Jerald and Sandra Tanner, critics of the Church of Jesus Christ of Latter-day Saints (LDS Church). The Book of Abraham has been a particular focus area of his research. The Tanners obtained an unauthorized copy of a microfilm strip containing images of the Kirtland Egyptian Papers in 1966, and with Marquardt's help published them for the first time as Joseph Smith's Egyptian Alphabet & Grammar. The Tanner publication was revised and updated by Marquardt in 1981. Marquardt added a critical apparatus and some interpretive material.

=== Collaboration with Wesley Walters ===
He was a collaborator with Wesley P. Walters, and made some of the first critical arguments for a different timeline of early Mormonism. Specifically, they argued that the Joseph Smith family did not move to Manchester until after 1820, and that the religious excitement Smith spoke of in his 1838 first vision account did not occur until 1823–1824. They also were among the first to argue that the Church of Christ was founded in Manchester, New York instead of Fayette, New York as is noted in the official history of the LDS Church.

== Mark Hofmann relationship ==
Shortly after Mark Hofmann began publishing forgeries, Marquardt reached out to Hofmann to study documents Hofmann apparently had in his collection. Hofmann had been nurturing a relationship with leaders of the Church of Jesus Christ of Latter-day Saints (LDS Church), and asked that Marquardt keep their relationship secret, due to Marquardt's reputation as a critic of the LDS Church. Hofmann frequently called and met with Marquardt, using his extensive knowledge of LDS Church history and extensive connections within the LDS Church critical history community to perpetuate his fraud. Marquardt pressed several times unsuccessfully to obtain photocopies of documents from Hofmann. Marquardt was one of the first people Hofmann shared the Salamander letter, in November 1984. Marquardt had suspicions as to its authenticity, and shared the contents of the letter with the Tanners, who shortly after were the first to publicly assert the letter was a forgery.

== Publications and recognition ==
Marquardt and Wesley P. Walters's book Inventing Mormonism: Tradition and the Historical Record was published in 1998. In 2014, Marquardt won the Best Documentary History Award from the John Whitmer Historical Association (JWHA) for his book Joseph Smiths 1828-1843 Revelations. In 2017, along with William Shepard, Marquardt was awarded the Best Historical Article Award by the JWHA for Mormons and Missourians 1839-1844.

== Personal life ==
Marquardt is a former Mormon. In the 1960s he lived in San Francisco. He was an employee of the postal service. In 1971, an accusation was brought to the Stake President of the Liberty Stake in Salt Lake City, accusing Marquardt of advocating for polygamy. At the time Marquardt was a practicing Mormon in good standing, and successfully convinced the President that he had no sympathy for polygamist groups, and "strongly sustained the president of the church.

== See also ==
- Jerald and Sandra Tanner
- Wesley P. Walters
