= Ed Decker =

American ex-Mormon (1935–2025)

John Edward Decker
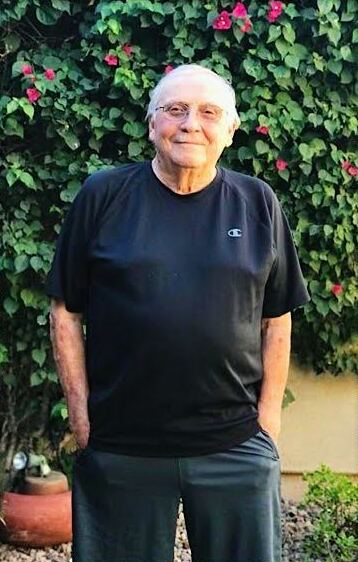
- Ed Decker
- Born: November 25, 1935; New York, U.S.
- Died: December 18, 2025 (aged 90)
- Education: Utah State University
- Occupations: evangelist, writer
- Known for: Christian apologist, author

John Edward Decker Jr. (November 25, 1935 – December 18, 2025) was an American countercult apologist and evangelist known for his studies, books and public presentations, of the negative aspects of the Church of Jesus Christ of Latter-day Saints (LDS Church) and Freemasonry. Decker was a former member of the LDS Church, and prominent early member of a Christian group for ex-Mormons called Saints Alive in Jesus. His most well-known book is The God Makers: A Shocking Expose of What the Mormon Church Really Believes, co-authored by Dave Hunt.

== Biography ==
Decker was born in New York on November 25, 1935, to a Jewish mother and Dutch father of the Reformed Christian faith but raised an Episcopalian. While attending Utah State University, he married a Latter-day Saint student named Phyllis and converted to the LDS Church. They later married in the Presbyterian Church on June 10, 1956, but divorced in 1969. He converted to evangelical Christianity in 1976.

Phyllis Decker contends that it was she who filed for divorce on the grounds of adultery and mental cruelty. In her affidavit, Phyllis Decker Danielson alleges that "the first ten years Ed and I were married, we moved twenty-six times. We moved a few more times in the remaining three years we were married. Ed had affairs for seven of those years and I was continually advised by the LDS church to forgive him". Since Decker neither appeared in divorce court or made answer to the charges on which the divorce was sought, a default judgment was ordered in Phyllis Decker's favor.

Decker married again, and had eight children, 10 grandchildren, and seven great-grandchildren. He was later a pastor in Palm Desert, California. Decker died on December 18, 2025, at the age of 90.

== Writings on Mormonism ==
Decker authored and coauthored books addressing the inner workings and negative aspects of the LDS religion. His book, The God Makers, was followed by The God Makers II. He released a book in November 2007, titled My Kingdom Come: The Mormon Quest for Godhood.

Additional books written in this genre, include Fast Facts on False Teachings, Decker's Complete Handbook on Mormonism, and Unmasking Mormonism. A fictional work by Decker, entitled The Mormon Dilemma was added to Conversations With The Cults—The Harvest House series, entitled What You Need to Know About Mormons.

He participated in the documentary films The God Makers, The Temple of the God Makers, The Mormon Dilemma, and The God Makers II. His smaller projects include the booklets "And The Word Became Flesh", "To Moroni, With Love!", and "Understanding Islam", which are distributed by his nonprofit organization.

=== Criticism ===
Decker's work has attracted criticism not only from Latter-day Saints, but from others outside the faith. Jerald and Sandra Tanner, two prominent critics of the LDS Church, and Robert Passantino have said that Decker's writings grossly misrepresent Mormonism, and thereby dilute his message and offend Mormons without attracting them to evangelical Christianity. The Tanners have noted what they contend are inaccuracies and errors in some of Decker's works.

One of Decker's associates offered to exorcise the Tanners' demons, and expressed great sadness when they refused.

== Works ==
Books

- The God Makers: A Shocking Expose of What the Mormon Church Really Believes, avec Dave Hunt, Harvest House Publishers, 1997, ISBN 978-1-56507-717-1
- The God Makers II
- My Kingdom Come – The Mormon Quest for Godhood, 2007
- Fast Facts on False Teachings
- Decker's Complete Handbook on Mormonism
- Unmasking Mormonism
- The Mormon Dilemma
- What You Need to Know About Mormons
- What You Need To Know About Masons
- The Dark Side of Freemasonry, Huntington House Publishers, 1994.
- Hotel Hope Kindle
- Crescent Moon Rising: The Islamic Invasion of America

Movies

- The God Makers
- The Temple Of The God Makers
- The Mormon Dilemma
- The God Makers II

Leaflets

- And The Word Became Flesh
- To Moroni, With Love!
- The Question of Freemasonry

== See also ==
- Anti-Mormonism
