= Wesley P. Walters =

Presbyterian pastor and historian of the Latter Day Saint movement

- Born: Wesley P. Walters; January 20, 1926
- Died: November 9, 1990 (aged 64)
- Occupation(s): Pastor and historian
- Website: www.pcahistory.org/mo/walters/index.html

Wesley Preston Walters (January 20, 1926 – November 9, 1990) was a pastor of the United Presbyterian Church in Marissa, Illinois. He is notable for his historical research critical of the Latter Day Saint Movement, specifically Joseph Smith's First Vision account. Historian Richard Bushman, who often differed with Walters' views, said that Walters, "performed a very positive service to the cause of Mormon History because he was a delver. He went deep into the heart of the archives. [He] made us realize that we can't assume anything. Everything had to be demonstrated and proved."

== Biography ==
Walters converted to Christianity and Presbyterianism as a teenager in Baltimore, Maryland, after being impressed by the preaching of Donald Barnhouse. As a teenager in Baltimore, he convinced two of his friends to not convert to the Church of Jesus Christ of Latter-day Saints (LDS Church). By 1960, Walters was married to his wife, Helen, had four children and was the pastor of the United Presbyterian congregation in Marissa, Illinois. He was asked to write an article about the LDS Church in the periodical Christianity Today, but felt inadequate, so the leaders of his church funded his research by sending him to Salt Lake City, Utah to study. This set him on the path of research and writing that would define the rest of his life, researching and publishing work critical of the Latter Day Saint movement.

Walters continued as a pastor for 30 years in Marissa until his sudden death in November 1990, after undergoing gall bladder surgery.

== Critical works ==
In 1967, Walters published a pamphlet, "New Light on Mormon Origins from Palmyra Revival" that challenged the canonical history of the LDS Church. It asserted that, contrary to Smith's claim, there was no revival where Smith grew up in Palmyra, New York prior his first vision, and that the setting for his story better fit a revival from 1823 to 1824. The pamphlet written by Walters created a stir, and provoked a strong response from scholars at Brigham Young University (BYU). By spring of 1968, BYU professor Truman G. Madsen organized approximately three dozen scholars to respond to Walters, and wrote to the LDS Church's First Presidency that the "first vision has come under severe historical attack." The thesis written by Walters and the subsequent response has framed the modern historical debate.

In 1971, he discovered a key document of evidence for the 1826 trial of Joseph Smith in the basement of a sheriff's office in Norwich, New York. Prior to this discovery, the reality of the 1826 trial had been questioned by some Latter-day Saint scholars.

== Publications ==
- The Challenge of the Cults co-authored chapter, Jan 1, 1961
- New light on Mormon Origins from Palmyra Revival Bulletin of the Evangelical Theological Society 10, no.4 (1967), republished in Dialogue 4 no.1 (1969)
- Joseph Smith among the Egyptians Journal of the Evangelical Theological Society Volume 16 No.1, Winter 1973
- Joseph Smith's Bainbridge, N.y., Court Trials and from Occult to Cult with Joseph Smith, Jr. 1977 reprint of two articles printed in 1974 and 1977
- The human origins of the Book of Mormon - 1979
- An Examination of B. H. Roberts' Secret Manuscript Paperback – Utah Lighthouse Ministry 1979
- Jehovah's Witnesses (IVP Booklets) Pamphlet with M. Kurt Goedelman – January 12, 1983
- The Use of The Old Testament In The Book of Mormon Utah Lighthouse Ministry – 1990
- Is Mormonism Christian?: A Look at the Teachings of the Mormon Religion with Harry L. Ropp and Charles Arthur Crane College Pr Pub Co – November 1, 1995
- Inventing Mormonism: Tradition and the Historical Record with H. Michael Marquardt – Signature Books October 15, 1998

== See also ==
- H. Michael Marquardt
- Jerald and Sandra Tanner
