= Dave Hunt (Christian apologist) =

Christian apologist (1926–2013)

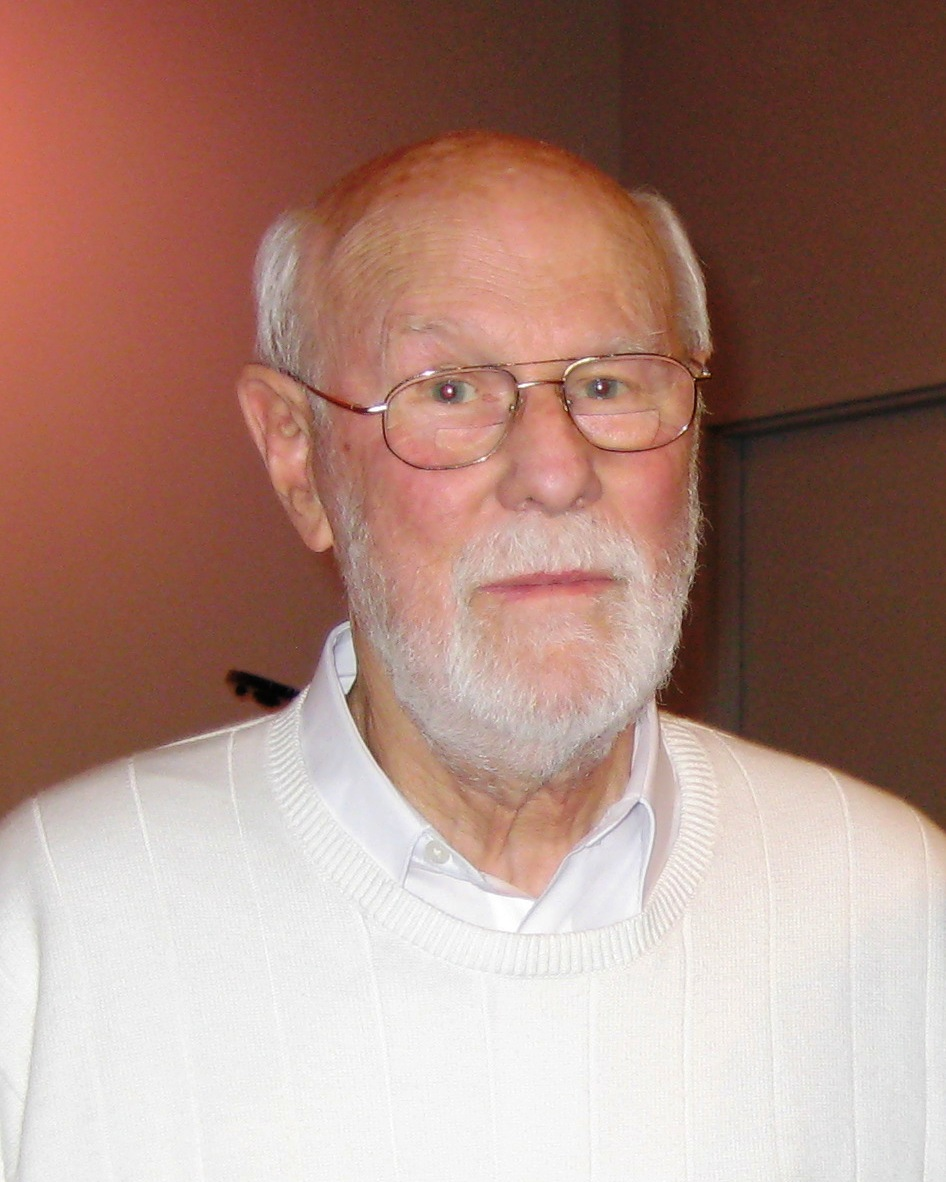
- Hunt in 2008 in Canada.
- Born: David Charles Haddon Hunt; September 30, 1926; Riverside, California
- Died: April 5, 2013 (aged 86); Bend, Oregon, U.S.
- Education: Bachelor of Science: Mathematics
- Alma mater: University of California, Los Angeles
- Occupations: apologist *author *speaker *radio commentator
- Years active: 1973–2013
- Known for: Apologetics
- Notable work: The God Makers; The Seduction of Christianity: Spiritual Discernment in the Last Days
- Website: thebereancall.org

David Charles Haddon Hunt (September 30, 1926 – April 5, 2013) was an American Christian apologist, speaker, radio commentator and author. He was in full-time ministry from 1973 until his death. The Berean Call, which highlights Hunt's material, was started in 1992. From 1999 to 2010, he also hosted Search the Scriptures Daily radio ministry alongside T.A. McMahon. Hunt traveled to the Near East, lived in Switzerland, and wrote numerous books on theology, prophecy, cults, and other religions, including critiques of Catholicism, Islam, Mormonism, and Calvinism, among others. Hunt's Christian theology was evangelical dispensational and he was associated with the Plymouth Brethren movement.

== Early and personal life ==
David Charles Haddon Hunt was born on September 30, 1926, in Riverside, California, to Lillian and Albert Hunt. He was raised in a Christian family, with two siblings. As a young man, he also spent time in the military, at the end of World War II. He studied at UCLA obtained a Bachelor of Science in mathematics; and married his college sweetheart, Ruth Klassen (1926–2013). The couple had four children: David, Janna, Karen and Jon. He worked as a CPA before his entry into full-time ministry.

== Positions ==
Hunt believed occult or pagan influences are pervasive in modern culture – this includes evolution, as well as all forms of psychology, some forms of entertainment, yoga, and some forms of medicine. His book Occult Invasion is dedicated to this area, while several other books mention it in part.

=== Creationism ===
Hunt was a strict Biblical Creationist – arguments against evolution and theistic evolution were a frequent topic of his radio programs, Search the Scriptures Daily and According to God's Word.

...I think you’ve got to be very stubborn to reject God and to say evolution—it all happened by chance. No rational person could support that thesis. And I would challenge anybody....—you know the more they get down—when we discovered electron microscopes and we got down to the molecular level of life, we found that it was far more complex than Darwin realized.

=== Calvinism ===
Hunt addressed Calvinism in a book called What Love is This? Calvinism's Misrepresentation of God, published in 2002 and revised in 2004 and 2006. He sought to refute many alleged misconceptions of Calvinism without taking an Arminian stance. He outlined a theological middle ground between Calvinism and Arminianism, where, according to Hunt, one can believe in eternal security but reject Calvinistic teaching.

Also published in 2004 was Debating Calvinism: Five Points, Two Views, co-written in a point-counterpoint debate format by Hunt and Calvinist apologist James White.

=== Catholicism ===
In A Woman Rides the Beast, he identified the Roman Catholic Church as the Whore of Babylon from the prophecies in chapters 17 and 18 of the Book of Revelation.

=== Mormonism ===
The book The Godmakers (1984), which Dave Hunt co-wrote with Ed Decker, and the accompanying film The God Makers (1982) by Jeremiah Films were an exposé of Mormonism, highlighting the Mormon belief that Jesus is the spirit brother of Lucifer and many other disturbing facts. The book and film have been criticized not only by Mormons themselves as inaccurate portrayals of their religion but also as inaccurate by other non-Mormon groups that are critical of Mormonism.

=== Prophecy ===
Dave Hunt regularly spoke on Bible prophecy, including his book A Cup of Trembling which warned against the then-current peace process.

=== Other ===
In 1973 he wrote the screenplay for Time to Run, a Christian film produced for the Billy Graham Evangelistic Association (Hunt later criticized Graham's ministry for its open ecumenism).

The Seduction of Christianity (co-written with Tom A. McMahon), which categorized Word of Faith teachings, meditation, and psychology-based counseling as New Age heresies, generated much debate in the 1980s. Responses from meditation proponents and from Calvinist re-constructionist writers include Seduction?? A Biblical Response and The Reduction of Christianity. Hunt has written a rejoinder to the latter critics in his Whatever Happened to Heaven?

Hunt wrote about Y2K with the intent of refuting the fearful predictions being made by other Christian fundamentalist writers (Y2K: A Reasoned Response To Mass Hysteria).

In his final book, "Cosmos, Creator and Human Destiny", Hunt supported the Creationist viewpoint and alleged that there were deficiencies in both the Big Bang theory and the theory of evolution.

== Bibliography ==
- America, Israel and Islam, ISBN 1-929125-32-1
- America, the Sorcerer's New Apprentice: The Rise of New Age Shamanism, ISBN 0-89081-651-4
- Battle for the Mind, ISBN 1-928660-09-6
- Beyond Seduction: A Return to Biblical Christianity, ISBN 0-89081-558-5
- Cosmos, Creator, and Human Destiny, ISBN 978-1-928660-64-4
- Countdown to the Second Coming, ISBN 0-89081-910-6
- The Cult Explosion, ISBN 0-89081-241-1
- A Cup of Trembling: Jerusalem and Bible Prophecy, ISBN 1-56507-334-7
- Death of a Guru, ISBN 0-89081-434-1
- Debating Calvinism: Five Points, Two Views; Dave Hunt and James White, ISBN 1-59052-273-7
- Global Peace and the Rise of Antichrist, ISBN 0-89081-831-2
- The God Makers, ISBN 1-56507-717-2
- Honest Doubts, ISBN 1-928660-34-7
- In Defense of the Faith: Biblical Answers to Challenging Questions, ISBN 1-56507-495-5
- Judgment Day! Islam, Israel and the Nations, ISBN 1-928660-32-0
- The Mind Invaders (formerly titled The Archon Conspiracy), ISBN 1-56507-831-4
- The New Spirituality, ISBN 1-56507-121-2
- Occult Invasion, ISBN 1-56507-269-3
- Peace, Prosperity, and the Coming Holocaust subtitled "The New Age Movement in Prophecy", ISBN 0-89081-331-0
- The Power of the Spirit (by William Law, edited by Dave Hunt), ISBN 0-87508-247-5
- Revelation Hoofbeats (contributing author), ISBN 1-59160-873-2
- Sanctuary of the Chosen, ISBN 1-56507-215-4
- Secret Invasion, ISBN 0-89081-560-7
- Seduction of Christianity: Spiritual Discernment in the Last Days, ISBN 0-89081-441-4
- Seeking and Finding God, ISBN 1-928660-23-1
- To Russia With Love (formerly titled Mission: Possible), ISBN 978-1-928660-36-1
- Toward the 7th Millennium: A Penetrating Look into the Future (contributing author), ISBN 0-937422-42-8
- Understanding the New Age Movement, ISBN 0-89081-682-4
- Unmasking Mormonism, ISBN 0-89081-801-0
- An Urgent Call to a Serious Faith, ISBN 0-7369-0313-5
- What Love Is This? Calvinism's Misrepresentation of God, ISBN 1-929125-30-5, 2 nd ed: ISBN 1-928660-12-6
- Whatever Happened to Heaven, ISBN 0-89081-698-0
- When Will Jesus Come?: Compelling Evidence for the Soon Return of Christ, ISBN 0-7369-1248-7
- A Woman Rides the Beast, ISBN 1-56507-199-9
- Y2K: A Reasoned Response to Mass Hysteria, ISBN 0-7369-0167-1
