= The God Makers =

Book and film about the LDS Church

The God Makers (also sometimes written as The Godmakers) is a book and film highlighting the inner workings and perceived negative aspects of the Church of Jesus Christ of Latter-day Saints (LDS Church). Former Mormon Ed Decker and Christian apologist Dave Hunt co-authored the book and film.

Jeremiah Films produced the film in 1982, expressing a highly critical view of the LDS Church, its practices, and its teachings. The film purports to be an exposé of the church's secrets, and has occasioned controversy among church members and non-members since its release, provoking passionate debates about its veracity and message. Two years after the release of the film, the book was published in 1984.

== Overview ==
The God Makers was first shown to a group of 4,000 evangelical Christians on December 31, 1982, at Grace Community Church in Sun Valley, California. It was thereafter screened in various churches as an attempt to educate or warn their members about Mormonism. Decker claimed that the film was seen by two and a half million people every month in the year following its release, although this number has been questioned as it would put it above most theatrical runs of major Hollywood films of that time. Nevertheless, the film did have considerable impact and generated its share of controversy.

=== Introduction and setting ===
The film depicts a meeting between Ed Decker and Dick Baer with two actors who portray Los Angeles attorneys.

The film states that Decker and Baer are there to consult "with a Los Angeles-based law firm about filing a class action lawsuit" against the LDS Church. Decker states that the church is a massive, multibillion-dollar corporation which shatters the lives of families and has ties into Satanism and the occult. Much of the dialogue occurs between Decker, Baer and the two actor/lawyers, in addition to interview segments with various other people interspersed throughout the film.

=== Temples ===
Dr. Harold Goodman, who is introduced as a Brigham Young University (BYU) professor, former Latter-day Saint bishop, and current mission president, provides quotes at various points throughout the film. Goodman states that the church is very family centered, and notes the importance of temple attendance and marriage to church members.

The film's narrator adds that the temple is used for "only secret ceremonies which are reserved for an elite few," and that temple attendance is required in order that "the worthy Mormon can become a god himself in the life hereafter, ruling over his own planet, with a number of goddess wives." It is stated that temple open houses are the only opportunity some members will ever have to enter the temple, as all those who do enter are required to live according to the basic tenets of the faith and receive a temple recommend from their ecclesiastical authority (bishop).

=== Many gods ===
Baer states that members of the LDS Church believe that there are "billions of these highly evolved humanoids" in space ruling their own planets. A woman is interviewed who said that her goal as a church member was to be "eternally pregnant". One of the actor/lawyers states that he finds it difficult to believe that the church members who are attorneys and judges that he associates with expect to become "infinite gods" and populate planets through "celestial sex" with their "goddess wives". He further states that he would be embarrassed to ask them about this. Decker responds that the Mormons are so embarrassed by it that they themselves don't even talk about it. Floyd McElveen, who is introduced as author of the bestseller, The Mormon Illusion, states that "their whole doctrine flows from this about becoming gods".

=== Animated segment ===
Decker and Baer run an animated film which utilizes teachings from Mormon prophets, including Joseph Smith's 1844 sermon the King Follett Discourse to illustrate the differences between Mormonism and Christianity. The animation depicts God the Father living on a planet called Kolob with his many identical, blonde "goddess wives" who are taking care of "spirit children" produced through endless celestial sex.

A plan is presented to create and populate the Earth, and all of the spirits in attendance vote on the matter. One third of the spirits follow Lucifer's plan and are denied physical bodies. Those that are "neutral" are born with black skin. Those who were valiant were to be lighter skinned and born into Mormon families on planet earth.

The narrator refers to statements made by LDS prophet Brigham Young teaching that thousands of years later, God the Father journeyed to earth "from a planet nearest to the star Kolob", to have sex with the virgin Mary, in order to provide Jesus with a physical body. It is also stated that LDS prophets have taught that the "Mormon Jesus" had a number of children through multiple wives. The narrator states that Joseph Smith Jr. claimed to be a direct descendant of Jesus Christ.

The animation portrays a brief history of the events described in the Book of Mormon. The narrator states that the Book of Mormon was recovered by "a young treasure seeker named Joseph Smith, who was known for his tall tales in upstate New York." The narrator states that the Mormons thank God for Joseph Smith and that Smith will sit in final judgment over them, along with God the Father and the Mormon Jesus. The film depicts Smith sitting in the center position with God the Father and the Mormon Jesus to either side during the judgment process. It is stated that Joseph Smith shed his blood for us, so that we too may become gods. Upon viewing the animation, one of the actor/lawyers comments that it sounds like something from von Däniken or Battlestar Galactica (the latter's creator, Glen A. Larson, was a Mormon, who added themes derived from the religion into the show).

Parts of the animated segment were featured in Bill Maher's religious documentary Religulous, due to the segment being posted on various video-sharing websites.

=== Divorce and suicide ===
The film states that the church pressures couples to divorce if they cannot endure the pressure of living up to the church standards. Decker states that his five children were pulled away from him by the LDS Church. Baer states that his wife had to divorce him and find another man who was "working his way to godhood".

It is also stated the Mormon women are under such constant pressure to be perfect that they are chronically depressed. The father and brother of a young suicide victim named Kip Eliason are interviewed. The family relates how Kip could not live up to the pressure of finding that his sexual compulsions placed him at odds with the teachings of the church.

The narrator states that Mormons used Christian terminology when speaking with nonmembers of the LDS Church, using words such as "God", "Jesus", and "salvation" to deceive potential converts.

=== Changing scriptures ===
Decker states that the LDS Church keeps changing its scriptures, but that Christian scholars are "always refining, always going back to the earliest manuscripts to improve and validate the authenticity of the holy scripture". He later states that "scripture is not to be tested".

Sandra Tanner is introduced as one of the greatest living authorities on Mormonism. Tanner states that Mormon leaders have deliberately kept members from their true history. Tanner discusses the various accounts written by Joseph Smith of the First Vision. Many of these accounts were unknown until the 1960s when LDS scholar Paul Cheeseman produced a master's thesis documenting some of the earliest first vision accounts.

Baer states that Joseph Smith claimed that the moon was inhabited, and that Brigham Young stated that the sun was inhabited as well.

Tanner and Decker discuss polygamy at some length. Tanner suggests that the Church has hidden documents that are not available to the public. She states that most members and missionaries are unaware of the deception and that the typical missionary "doesn't even realize he couldn't go to Salt Lake and see these documents for himself".

=== Book of Mormon and Book of Abraham ===
Dr. Charles Crane is introduced as an author, college professor, and expert on Mormon archaeology, while Dr. Richard Phales is introduced as an author, lecturer, and archaeologist. Crane states that he has looked over maps and checked archaeological information, and that he cannot locate the land of Zarahemla. Phales adds that "we have never excavated one single artifact" related to the Book of Mormon. The narrator further states that archaeology has been able to prove the existence of all great civilizations. Coins are used as an example, and Crane mentions what he states are coins listed in the Book of Mormon. Crane concludes that the Book of Mormon is a fairy tale, much like Alice in Wonderland. Decker adds that the church is converting people by claiming that archaeology has proven the Book of Mormon to be true.

The Smithsonian Institution also seems to assert the same thing. It predicates that the Book of Mormon is not supported by Smithsonian Institution's archaeological research, and states, "The Smithsonian Institution has never used the Book of Mormon in any way as a scientific guide. Smithsonian archaeologists see no direct connection between the archaeology of the New World and the subject matter of the [Book of Mormon].

Crane also mentions the Book of Abraham, stating that it was translated from fragments of papyrus that Joseph Smith purchased from an Egyptologist, and that the manuscript resurfaced in 1967 and was found by several famous Egyptologists to have nothing to do with Abraham. Crane adds that Smith took "one little letter" that "looks like a backward 'e'", and produced from it 76 words.

=== Temple rituals ===
A reenactment of temple rituals is shown, which are said to be performed for the purpose of "evangelizing the dead". The narrator states that without these rituals, "no one can enter the presence of Joseph Smith and become a god". The narrator states that Mormons are encouraged to contact the dead and that it is common for demons to appear to Mormons asking them to perform family history work for them. Several people discuss temple garment, or "holy Mormon underwear", and several stories are told of people who refused to remove this underwear under any circumstances, including bathing and giving birth.

=== Occult ===
Baer states that Joseph Smith was arrested and convicted for pretending to find buried treasure using a seer stone. Decker produces what he refers to as a Satanic Bible, in which the word "Mormo" is said to represent the "king of ghouls", and whose followers are called Mormons. Baer also claims that in Chinese, the word Mormon means "gates of hell".

The term "Mormon" is a nickname given to the Latter-day Saint community and based on the name of one of the central spiritual texts of the religion, the Book of Mormon. It is a phrase used in the LDS Church's "I'm a Mormon" campaign to describe the church's members. Some members of the LDS Church officially refer to themselves only as Latter-day Saints.

=== Economic power ===
The economic power of the LDS Church is discussed. A man introduced as "Doctor John L. Smith, author and expert on the vast wealth of the Mormon church", states that the LDS Church is the second largest financial institution west of the Mississippi and that it is difficult to determine what the church actually owns. The narrator adds that the church has "vast land holdings", and that billions of dollars are extracted from church members through a mandatory tithing program. The church is also said to own a substantial portion of the state of Hawaii.

=== Conclusion ===
The film concludes with the two actors playing lawyers stating that they cannot take the case, because they don't believe that a jury will believe them. They state that the LDS Church has "billions" with which to fight the case and that it would take years. Kip Eliason's father reads a letter that his son left him before he committed suicide, after which a woman is asked by an interviewer what she would miss the most if she left the church. The woman replies that she would "rather be dead" than leave.

== Controversy ==
The film created considerable controversy in some of the communities in which it has been shown, even leading to threats and violence, and was described by Truman G. Madsen, LDS professor of religion and philosophy, as "religious pornography". The negative reaction came from both Mormons and non-Mormons.

The Anti-Defamation League of the B'nai B'rith publicly presented their concerns of the film which they described as "Mormon bashing" and "invidious and defamatory". Rhonda M. Abrams, Regional Director stated the following:

I sincerely hope that people of all faiths will similarly repudiate The God Makers as defamatory and untrue, and recognize it for what it truly represents — a challenge to the religious liberty of all.

It was noted by LDS scholars that the film portrays Mormonism as a cult far removed from mainstream Christianity, and that many statements that are represented as Mormon doctrine are not actual doctrine, with a particular emphasis on "those ideas which would seem most anomalous to Christians". In particular, the repeated references to endless celestial sex are viewed as absurd and profane.

LDS respondents claim that the film portrays all Mormons as either part of a conspiracy to cover up information or as being deluded by their leaders.

=== Criticism from the National Conference of Christians and Jews ===
Max Jennings, editor of the National Conference of Christians and Jews (NCCJ), attended a showing in Mesa, Arizona that was sponsored by a group known as Concerned Christians, whose purpose was "to reach out in love to those lost in Mormonism". Jennings reported that "If what I saw Tuesday night is love, I must have had the wrong Sunday School lessons back in that dusty, west Texas Methodist Church of my childhood. I didn't hear anyone reaching out in love Tuesday night. I heard people reaching out in hatred of another's right to believe what he wants."

The NCCJ committee sent a letter to Concerned Christians on December 5, 1983 which stated, among other things, that

[t]he film does not fairly portray the Mormon Church, Mormon history, or Mormon belief. It makes extensive use of half-truths, faulty generalizations, sensationalism, and is not reflective of the true spirit of Mormon faith. We find particularly offensive the emphasis that Mormonism is some sort of subversive plot — a danger to the community, a threat to the institution of marriage, and destructive to the mental health of teenagers. We are of the opinion that the film relies heavily on appeals to fear, prejudice and unworthy human emotions.

The film's creator has criticized the NCCJ for allegedly failing to contact Jeremiah Films, which produced The God Makers, for the purpose of elucidating claimed errors and prevarications in the film.

=== Further criticisms ===
Decker's work has also attracted criticism not only from Latter-day Saints, but also from outside the faith. Jerald and Sandra Tanner and Bob Passantino have said that Decker's writings grossly misrepresent Mormonism, and thereby dilute his message and offend Mormons without attracting them to evangelical Christianity. The Tanners, themselves prominent critics of the LDS Church, have noted what they contend are inaccuracies and errors in some of Decker's works such as "Ed Decker's ability to make up stories," "his ability to fabricate evidence to support his own opinions," and his choice of "the path of sensationalism in his work on Mormonism." One of Decker's associates offered to exorcise the Tanners's demons, and expressed great sadness when they refused.

Gilbert W. Scharffs, a teacher from the LDS Institute of Religion near the University of Utah, wrote a lengthy rebuttal, stating that "The book relies on scare words that are emotionally laden. It is filled with words calculated to alarm others and give offense to Latter-day Saints" and has also noted that "some have said The God Makers is its own worst enemy."

=== Effects of the film ===
The film was publicized through conservative Christian broadcast media, which was on the rise in the 1980s. It was primarily screened for church attendees, who saw it as a definitive explanation of Mormonism. This damaged the public perception of the LDS Church. But despite popularity in some Christian circles, by the time the sequel was produced, the books and films received strong criticism for their outlandish claims and tone, even from other critics of Mormonism. The film's impact might have stayed with mostly evangelical Christians, but for a series of LDS-related scandals in the 1980s and 1990s, which turned media attention toward Mormon criticisms.

In January 1990, Decker claimed that the film had produced a three million person shortfall in projected converts to the church. This claim was based upon a statement made by M. Russell Ballard at BYU on November 14, 1989. Ballard never mentioned a shortfall, but instead stated that the church continued to grow despite films such as The God Makers. Decker later retracted his claim.

== Sequels and books ==
Following the debut of the original 1982 film, a book was published as The God Makers in 1984 by Harvest House. In 1984 another short film was released as The Temple of the Godmakers, depicting more of the temple ceremony reenactment than in the 1982 film. A sequel film The God Makers II was released in 1992, followed in 1993 by the book published by Harvest.

== See also ==
- Anti-Mormonism
- Criticism of Mormonism
