= Evangelical Ministries to New Religions =

Christian counter-cult organizations

- Abbreviation: EMNR
- Formation: 1982
- Founder: Gordon Lewis, Walter Martin, James Bjornstad, Ronald Enroth
- Type: Christian countercult group
- Purpose: Evangelize to members of new religious movements (NRMs)
- President: L.L. (Don) Veinot, Jr
- Subsidiaries: Watchman Fellowship; New England Institute of Religious Research; Midwest Christian Outreach; Institute for Religious Research; Apologetics Evangelism - NAMB/SBC; Apologetics Resource Center; Apologia; ARMOR; Biola University; Christian Apologetics Program; BRIDGE; CANA/Christian Answers for the New Age; Centers for Apologetics Research; Christian Perspectives International; Christian Research and Counsel; Current Issues in Alternative Medicine; Evidence Ministries; Gospel Truth Ministries; Families Against Cults of Indiana; Fire Escape Ministries; Freedom In Truth Outreach; Haven Ministries; Discernment Ministries International; Jesus Christ Saves Ministries; Life Assurance Ministries; Mormonism Research Ministry; Naming the Grace; Refuge Ministries; Religious Information Center; Resource Center for Theological Research; Rooftop Ministries; Stormwatch Ministries; Spiritwatch Ministries; True Light Educational Ministry; Word for the Weary
- Website: www.emnr.org
- Formerly called: Evangelical Ministries to Cultists

Evangelical Ministries to New Religions (EMNR) is a coalition of Christian countercult organizations. It was founded by Gordon Lewis, James Bjornstad, Ronald Enroth, and Walter Ralston Martin in 1982.

== Purpose and activities ==
The organization brings together groups and individuals who evangelize to members of new religious movements (NRMs) and seeks legitimacy and accountability for the countercult movement. Gordon Lewis, one of the group's founders, defines a cult as a "religious group which claims authorization by Christ and the Bible, but neglects or distorts the gospel". EMNR aims to consolidate much of the scattered countercult movement and establish a ubiquitous mission strategy for movements they see as non-Christian or threatening to traditional Protestant Christianity.

EMNR holds conferences about pertinent issues, publishes relevant materials, encourages networking between member groups, and makes recommendations of helpful agencies and materials that meet its standards.

== Organization ==
James Lopez currently serves as EMNR’s Executive Director. A full list of the organization's current members can be found here.

== History ==
=== Formation ===
The countercult movement has long been divided over its goals and the tactics it should use to achieve those goals, which left the movement lacking cohesiveness. The participants in a 1982 Christian conference on cults and new religious movements voted to form a permanent anticult coalition, which they named Evangelical Ministries to Cultists. This coalition was coordinated by Gordon Lewis, a well-known figure within the countercult community. Other founders include Walter Martin, James Bjornstad, and Ronald Enroth.

The group was designed to carry out the directives established by the 1974 Lausanne Covenant, a Christian manifesto adopted by the International Congress on World Evangelization that explains and promotes active global evangelism.

=== Name change ===
In late 1984, the group's name was officially changed to Evangelical Ministries to New Religions, after the founders realized that the original name was likely to be seen as offensive to members of new religious movements.

=== MEDS ===
In 1997, EMNR's Committee on Ethics (which at the time consisted of Eric Pement and Craig Branch) drafted the Manual of Ethical and Doctrinal Standards (MEDS). This document spells out the guidelines for EMNR members' expected practices in evangelism. It represents a major step in bringing cohesion to the countercult movement through the clarification of doctrine and goals, the articulation of ethical standards of conduct, and the approval of countercult material.

MEDS also represents an attempt to professionalize EMNR's sector of the countercult movement, a trend in the broader movement as well. Its warnings against falsifying credentials and embellishing pertinent stories demonstrate a desire for legitimacy and respect from serious parties on all sides.

MEDS does not explicitly define the doctrine its members should express, but the Lausanne Covenant and its sibling document the Manila Manifesto of 1989 provide a basis for the expected religious beliefs and values of EMNR's members. These documents call for public faith, fervent evangelism, and firm belief in the absolute authority of the Old and New Testaments.

== Reactions ==
Although EMNR is meant to unify groups within the Christian countercult movement, it does not attempt to or claim to include all those that exist. The coalition's structured standards and emphasis on accountability deter some related groups from joining, even though submitting to the EMNR's authority is essentially voluntary. Tensions between groups also contribute to a less than uniform wave to join. On a broader level, there is no consensus within the Christian community as to whether evangelism is even the right approach to take for those opposed to new religious movements.

Some analysts are critical of EMNR’s attitude toward the people it attempts to reach. Douglas Cowan, a sociologist of religion at the University of Waterloo, Ontario, points out the discrepancies between its demands for countercult activists to respect non-Christians and the loaded language with which it sometimes describes non-Christians.
