= Christian Research Institute =

Evangelical Christian ministry

The CRI logo

The Christian Research Institute (CRI) is an evangelical Christian apologetics ministry. It was established in October 1960 in the state of New Jersey by Walter Martin (1928–1989). In 1974, Martin relocated the ministry to San Juan Capistrano, California. The ministry's office was relocated in the 1990s near Rancho Santa Margarita. In 2005, the organization moved to its present location in Charlotte, North Carolina.

== Background ==
The establishment of CRI in 1960 is closely linked to Walter Martin. It represents one of the pioneering organizations in what is called the Christian countercult movement, but also relates to the wider history of Evangelical Christian apologetics in the mid-twentieth century.

Martin is considered one of the first full-time career apologists to have specialized in Christian countercult apologetics. In 1949, Martin began his forays into the theological analysis of various groups, such as Jehovah's Witnesses, Christian Science, Mormonism and Spiritualism. Much of this early work coincided with his tertiary studies at Shelton College and New York University during the 1950s.

In 1953, Martin became acquainted with the Presbyterian radio Bible teacher Donald Grey Barnhouse. Barnhouse was the founding editor (1950) of the monthly periodical Eternity magazine. Stephen Board, in his study of the history of evangelical periodicals, has observed that during its first decade of publishing Eternity was built around Barnhouse's personality and his own particular causes.

In 1954, Barnhouse invited Martin to be a columnist in Eternity magazine, and then between 1955 and 1960 Martin served as a regular contributing editor. Martin wrote a number of articles about cults, which formed the embryonic texts for various books he wrote. However, Martin also wrote book reviews, examined general apologetics and doctrinal issues, and also considered social questions such as alcoholism.

The early 1950s witnessed the publication of several books that Martin wrote, or co-wrote with Norman Klann, such as Jehovah of the Watchtower (1953), The Christian Science Myth (1954), The Rise of the Cults (1955) and The Christian and the Cults (1956). Barnhouse wrote the foreword to The Christian Science Myth, and his support for Martin's ministry was crucial in legitimating countercult apologetics to the wider church constituency. In 1960, Barnhouse died from a brain tumor only a few weeks before Martin formally established CRI. By that time Martin had become an emerging apologist whose ministry and reputation was gaining recognition in parachurch organizations like the American Tract Society, Evangelical Theological Society, National Association of Evangelicals, and National Religious Broadcasters.

== Early ministry development ==
The basic charter for CRI began with the aim of serving as a bureau of information on cults, other religions, and Christian apologetics. Walter Martin subsequently gave this summary profile about CRI: "The Institute's purpose is to supply primary data on all the cults, and non-Christian missionary activities, both here and abroad. It is the function of this Institute to index the major cults and to supply resumes of their origin, history, and doctrines, with bibliographical material aimed at specifically evangelizing and refuting their respective teachings."

CRI was assisted by individual donors and by charitable grants from organizations like the Pew Foundation. CRI was administered by a board of directors that included Martin's brother-in-law Everett Jacobson.

In the early 1960s, much of CRI's activities centered on Martin's itinerant preaching ministry in churches and with parachurch organizations. Martin delivered seminars throughout North America on the problems churches and missionaries faced with cults. He utilized the emergence of audio-cassette tapes with several of his seminar presentations recorded and initially distributed by Bible Voice Inc. in New Jersey and the Audio Bible Society in Pennsylvania (later through Vision House and finally by CRI itself).

Martin also developed a profile on radio initially as a co-host of Barnhouse's Bible Study Hour, then as a regular panel guest on the Long John Nebel show in the 1960s. Martin then became the host of his own shows, The Bible Answer Man and Dateline Eternity. The shows became nationally syndicated and accelerated in popularity following the ministry's relocation to California.

Martin sought to develop a library of resources on cults and apologetics, including books, audio files, and periodicals. He encouraged the development of a bureau of speakers associated with CRI, which in the 1960s included figures such as Walter Bjorck, Floyd Hamilton, James Bjornstad and Shildes Johnson. Other prominent theologians who were affiliated with CRI included Harold O. J. Brown and John Warwick Montgomery. The intention was to maintain a network of scholars involved in apologetics.

CRI produced various tracts about the Mormons and Jehovah's Witnesses, distributed tapes, books and booklets by Martin, and initially ran a periodical in 1961–62 known as Religious Research Digest. In 1968, the ministry published a 26-page booklet UFO: Friend Foe or Fantasy.

In 1963, Martin conceived of the idea of creating a computer data bank of apologetics information. The concept was subsequently framed under the acronym SENT/EAST (Electronic Answering Search Technology). In 1968, a symposium of scholars was convened in Austria where the plans for CRI's computerized apologetics data bank were presented in lectures by Martin and John Warwick Montgomery. Much of these details were reported in Christianity Today and then in Montgomery's book Computers, Cultural Change and the Christ.

== Transfer to California ==
In 1974 Martin left New Jersey and relocated to California, and this also entailed the transfer of CRI. In the early stages Martin was assisted by Bob and Gretchen Passantino as staff members in CRI. Martin also became part of the teaching faculty of the newly formed Melodyland School of Theology in Anaheim, where countercult apologetics was integrated into the curriculum and the 13,000 volumes of CRI's library was housed there. Later the ministry opened an office in El Toro, and then shifted to larger premises in Irvine.

The upsurge of interest in Martin's work and CRI coincided with the Jesus People revolution, the counterculture, and the social conflicts over new cults in the 1970s. During the 1970s and 1980s a number of younger apologists were mentored by Martin through CRI and included Cal Beisner, Todd Ehrenborg, Craig Hawkins, Carole Hausmann, Kurt Van Gorden, John Weldon, George Mather, Paul Carden, Rich Poll, Robert M. Bowman Jr., Kenneth Samples, and Elliot Miller. The profile of CRI increased with the widespread sales of Martin's book The Kingdom of the Cults (now with approximately 750,000 copies sold), his audio-tape albums, his radio ministry, and his appearances on national television.

Martin was also involved in the establishment of the MA program in apologetics at the Simon Greenleaf School of Law (now Trinity Law School) in 1980. Martin taught there on cults and the occult throughout the 1980s, and was assisted from time to time by Bob and Gretchen Passantino.

In 1977, CRI launched a new quarterly periodical called the Christian Research Institute Newsletter, which in 1978 was retitled Forward. Through this periodical analyses were published about such movements as Hare Krishna, Jonestown, Rajneesh, the New Age and Satanism.

In 1983 CRI established the Instituto Cristão de Pesquisas (ICP), an affiliate ministry in São Paulo, Brazil. Founded by staff researcher Paul Carden, it was eventually led by Martin disciple Paulo Romeiro.

In 1987 Forward was revamped as Christian Research Journal, which was initially devised as a triennial publication. In 1990, the journal was enlarged in size and became a quarterly publication, and has since become a monthly periodical. The Christian Research Journal has won several awards of excellence from the Evangelical Press Association. The journal now covers a wider range of issues in addition to cults, such as general apologetics, ethical apologetics, world religions, and theological controversies. It also includes contributed essays by authors who are not staff members with CRI.

== Ministry post-1989 ==
On June 26, 1989, Martin died at his home of a heart attack at age 60. The news of Martin's death was reported in various Christian periodicals. Hank Hanegraaff succeeded Martin as the ministry's president.

Both at the time of Martin's death and then in the immediate years to follow, a number of staff researchers associated with CRI began to emerge as authors of various countercult apologetics books. These authors included Richard Abanes, Robert M. Bowman, Erwin M. de Castro, Craig Hawkins, Robert J. Lyle, Elliot Miller, B. J. Oropeza, Ron Rhodes, and Kenneth Samples. Many of these authors left CRI and started their own organizations or joined others.

== Controversies ==
=== Countercult apologetics ===
Due to the controversial nature of the Christian countercult movement, both Martin and CRI have been involved in various theological and social conflicts. During Martin's lifetime a variety of conflicts erupted between himself and various leaders of religious groups, but especially with Mormons. These clashes sometimes led to public debates and even a lawsuit filed by Martin for alleged defamation.

For a short time in the late 1970s CRI and Martin were involved in a controversy over claims that apologists had located part of the manuscript of the Book of Mormon, which allegedly had been plagiarized from a novel by Solomon Spaulding. The case was argued in a book, Who Really Wrote the Book of Mormon? by Wayne Cowdrey, Howard Davis and Donald Scales. However, the case was seriously questioned by Christian apologists and Mormonism critics Jerald and Sandra Tanner in Did Spaulding Write the Book of Mormon? It was also rebutted by Mormon apologists Robert and Rosemary Brown in volume two of their series of books They Lie in Wait to Deceive. Edward Plowman reported on the CRI claims in Christianity Today magazine in July 1977, and then in October 1977 updated his report with evidence that pointed to the collapse in credibility of the claims.

A book entitled Who Really Wrote the Book of Mormon? – The Spalding Enigma (Concordia Publishing House, July 2005) attempts to revive the original argument. Co-authors Cowdrey, Davis, and Vanick attempt to show that Sidney Rigdon did in fact visit Pittsburgh, the last residence of Spalding, before 1820. A paper authored by LDS affiliated research group Foundation for Ancient Research and Mormon Studies (FARMS) devoted nearly 130 pages to review the 2005 book and its claims.

Widow of CRI news editor William Alnor gives her account of the controversies involving Walter Martin and Hank Hanegraaff in her account called, "Dueling Bible Answer Men" parts 1 and 2 by Jackie Alnor.

=== Financial accountability ===
The "Group for CRI Accountability," which included terminated employees, alleged that CRI's 1992 withdrawal from the Evangelical Council for Financial Accountability (ECFA) was to avoid restrictions on financial dealings with its chief executive, Hank Hanegraaff. After it had rejoined, a 2003 ECFA audit found CRI to be out of compliance with a number of financial standards. This resulted in sanctions requiring that "the board of directors be strengthened" and a "significant reimbursement" be made to CRI. Ministry Watch issued a Donor Alert in 2004 regarding CRI's failure to respond to repeated requests to explain corrective steps it has taken in regard to findings of violations of three of ECFA's Seven Standards of Responsible Stewardship.

=== Conversion of Hank Hanegraff to Eastern Orthodoxy ===
CRI President Hank Hanegraff was baptized into the Eastern Orthodox church on Palm Sunday, April 9, 2017. In a subsequent broadcast Hanegraff responded to charges that he had "walked away from the Christian faith" due to his departure from Protestant Christianity. "If I have caused any to stumble I humbly ask for forgiveness. My purpose in reading this is not so much to respond to anyone, but to reassure... I have never been more deeply in love with the Lord Jesus Christ and his body the church." CRI has defended the Eastern Orthodox doctrine of theosis in a video on the CRI website. Hanegraff's conversion has raised questions among evangelicals, who point to major differences between Eastern Orthodoxy and evangelical Protestantism.
