= Hank Hanegraaff =

American writer and radio host

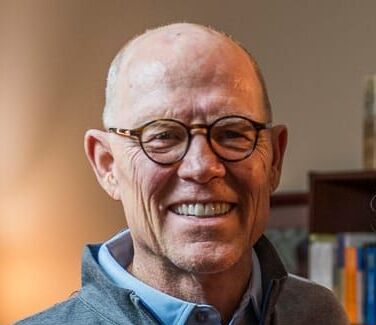
- Hanegraaff in 2022
- Born: 1950 (age 75–76); Netherlands
- Occupations: Author, radio talk-show host and advocate of Christianity
- Spouse: Kathy
- Children: 12
- Writing career
- Language: English
- Subjects: Criticisms of non-Christian religions, new religious movements or cults and heresies within Christianity
- Notable works: Christianity in Crisis, Counterfeit Revival

Hendrik "Hank" Hanegraaff (born 1950), also known as the "Bible Answer Man", is an American Christian author and radio talk-show host. Formerly an evangelical Protestant, he joined the Eastern Orthodox Church in 2017. He is an outspoken figure within the Christian countercult movement, where he has established a reputation for his critiques of non-Christian religions, new religious movements, and cults, as well as heresy in Christianity. He is also an apologist on doctrinal and cultural issues.

== Career ==
Prior to becoming a leading figure in the Christian countercult movement, Hanegraaff was closely affiliated with the ministry of D. James Kennedy of Coral Ridge Presbyterian Church in Florida. During his association with Kennedy in the 1980s, he applied memory-based techniques (such as acrostic mnemonics) to help develop and spread strategies and methods for personal Christian evangelism. His work resembles memory dynamics techniques developed in speed-reading courses and in memory training programs used in some executive business courses.

During the late 1980s, Hanegraaff became associated with Walter Ralston Martin at the Christian Research Institute (CRI), the conservative Protestant countercult and apologetic ministry which Martin founded in 1960.

After Martin's death from heart failure in June 1989, Hanegraaff became president of CRI. As part of his duties, Hanegraaff took over from Martin the role of anchorman on the radio program The Bible Answer Man and became a conference speaker and itinerant preacher in churches, where he pursued the general ministry charter of CRI.

The content of The Bible Answer Man show typically includes call-in questions from listeners about general Christian doctrine, biblical interpretation, and denominational particularities, as well as a regular special focus on a particular issue when a notable figure is a guest. A frequently treated special topic is Mormonism, with former Mormons appearing in studio as guests to speak from their experiences.

Shortly after the release of Dan Brown's novel The Da Vinci Code, he co-authored The Da Vinci Code: Fact or Fiction? with Lutheran historian and apologist Paul L. Maier. In 2013 he wrote Afterlife: What You Need To Know About Heaven, The Hereafter & Near-Death Experiences, from Worthy Publishing.

Throughout the 1990s, Hanegraaff engaged in dialogue with Joseph Tkach Jr. and other leaders of the Worldwide Church of God (WCG), now known as Grace Communion International (GCI). The WCG was founded in the 1930s by Herbert W. Armstrong, and had long been regarded as a cult by evangelicals, primarily for its denial of the Trinity and other traditional Christian doctrines. Following Armstrong's death in 1986, the group re-evaluated many of its teachings, including the British Israel doctrine and various eschatological predictions. Hanegraaff was one of a handful of evangelical apologists, including Ruth A. Tucker, who assisted in the reforms. The biggest changes to ensure their acceptance among evangelicals were in embracing the doctrines of the Trinity and of salvation by grace through faith.

=== 2007 defamation suit ===
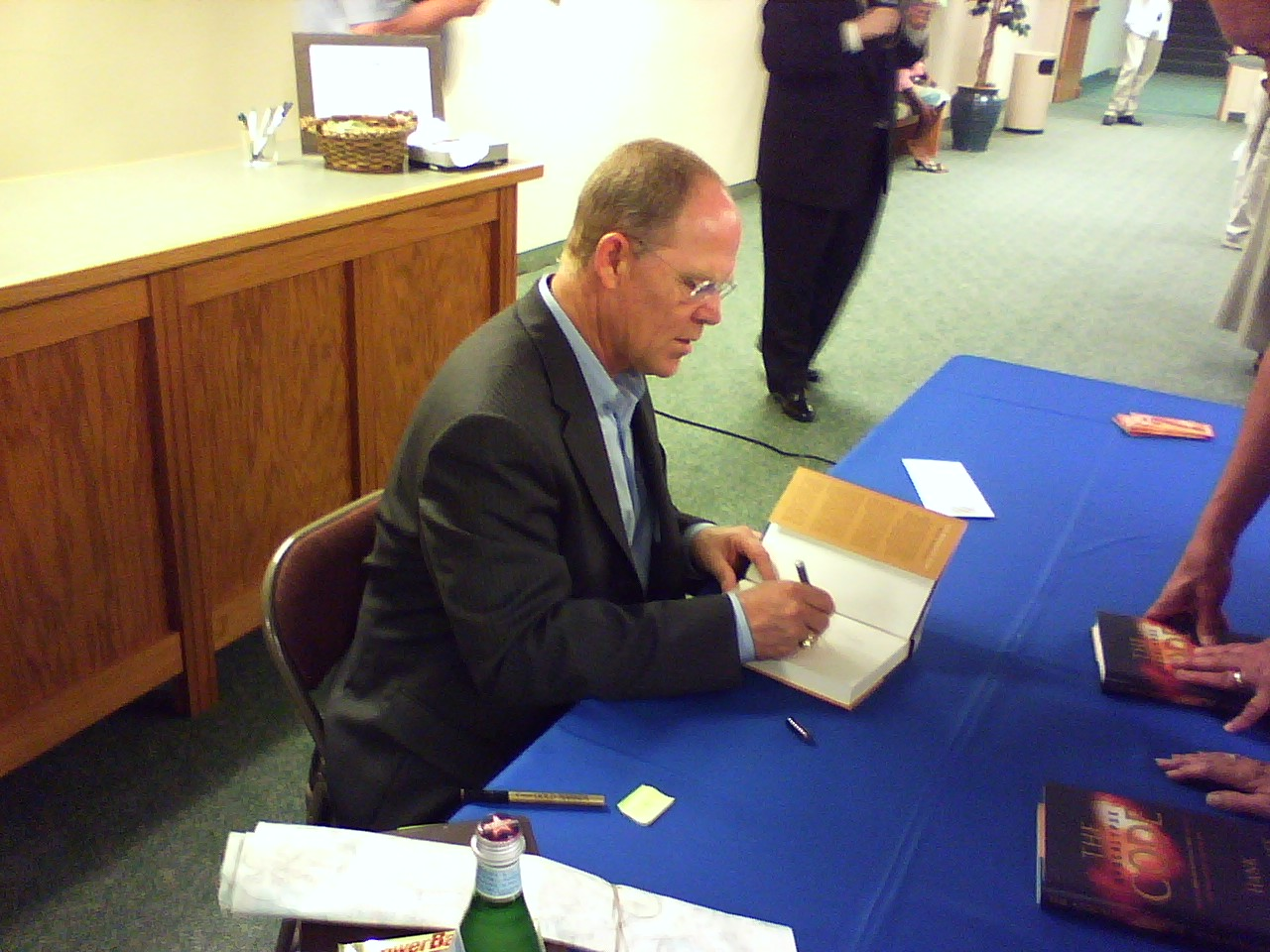
Hank Hanegraaff signs books at a 2007 event in St. Louis.

Hanegraaff sued longtime critic William Alnor for alleging that Hanegraaff's fundraising was under investigation for mail fraud. The allegation was based on an incident of misdirected mail, which was followed by a January 2005 CRI fundraising letter saying the error might have caused "perhaps hundreds of thousands of dollars" in donations to be lost. The defamation lawsuit was thrown out based on California's anti-SLAPP statute. The court found that although Alnor's statements regarding a mail fraud investigation were false, Hanegraaff was unlikely to prove "actual malice."

== Books ==
=== Christianity in Crisis ===
In his 1993 book Christianity in Crisis, Hanegraaff charged the Word of Faith movement with heretical teachings, saying that many of the Word of Faith groups were cults, and that those who knowingly accepted the movement's theology were "clearly embracing a different gospel, which is in reality no gospel at all."

=== Counterfeit Revival ===
Hanegraaff revisited some of the same issues in his 1997 book Counterfeit Revival, in which he rejected the claims of many Charismatic teachers such as Rodney Howard Browne concerning what became known as the Toronto Blessing. The Toronto Blessing was associated with the Vineyard church located near the Toronto Airport, and was marked by spontaneous and sustained outbursts of bodily phenomena such as laughter, shaking, bouncing, and "resting in the Spirit". A different but related set of phenomena and claims subsequently emanated from churches in Pensacola, Florida, and became known as the Brownsville Revival.

One of the book's primary arguments is that many ostensible "manifestations of the Spirit" in Pentecostal, Charismatic, and Neo-Charismatic or "third-wave" affiliated churches are caused by psychological manipulation of parishioners, and that many of the "signs and wonders" claimed by these churches are fraudulent or result from manipulation, peer pressure, subtle suggestions, altered states of consciousness from repetitive chanting or singing, or expectations of supernatural events. Hanegraaff argues that many of the practices within these movements are not biblically sanctioned or appropriate and are based on misinterpretations of scripture. He contends that these movements rely too much on subjective experiences or feelings.

James A. Beverley, professor of theology and ethics at Tyndale Seminary (formerly Ontario Theological Seminary) in Toronto, Canada, reviewed Counterfeit Revival in Christianity Today, and wrote that while the book "exposes some real excesses and imbalances in the current charismatic renewal movements", it is a "misleading, simplistic, and harmful book, marred by faulty logic [and] outdated and limited research".

Hanegraaff responded on equip.org, the CRI website, by arguing that Beverley had received funding from the Vineyard in the past and that he was aligned with them generally. Hanegraaff implied that Beverley had been compensated to write a "hit piece" for Christianity Today.

=== Afterlife ===
In 2013, Hanegraaff published the book Afterlife: What You Need To Know About Heaven, The Hereafter & Near-Death Experiences, where he addresses questions that have been raised during his radio show regarding heaven and eternal life.

== Personal life ==
Hanegraaff was born in the Netherlands and raised in the United States from childhood. He and his wife Kathy have twelve children. In the mid-2000s, seeking to save money on ministry operations, Hanegraaff and his wife moved from Southern California to Charlotte, North Carolina. In subsequent years Hanegraaff became increasingly discontented with evangelicalism; a period of research and seeking led him to the Eastern Orthodox Church. On Palm Sunday, 9 April 2017, together with his wife Kathy and two of their sons, he was received by chrismation into St. Nektarios Greek Orthodox Church in Charlotte, a parish within the Greek Orthodox Archdiocese of America. Apparently the largest negative reaction to his conversion was that his syndicated radio program was dropped by the Bott Radio Network, which operates at least 119 Christian radio stations in at least 13 states. Some other radio stations did the same.

In 2017 Hanegraaff revealed that he has mantle cell lymphoma.

== Bibliography ==
Non-fiction

- Christianity in Crisis. Eugene: Harvest House Publishers. 1993. ISBN 0-89081-976-9.
- Counterfeit Revival (1st ed.). Dallas: Word Publishing Group (Thomas Nelson). 1997. 315pp. ISBN 9780849911828.
- (General editor) The Kingdom of the Cults (Minneapolis: Bethany, 1997).
- The FACE That Demonstrates the Farce of Evolution (Nashville: Word, 1998).
- Millennium Bug Debugged (Minneapolis: Bethany, 1998).
- Resurrection (Nashville: Word, 2000).
- The Prayer of Jesus (Nashville: Word, 2001).
- Counterfeit Revival (2nd ed.). W. Publishing Group (Thomas Nelson). 2001. 416pp. ISBN 9780849942945.
- Fatal Flaws (Nashville: Word, 2003).
- Bible Answer Book (Nashville: J. Countryman, 2004).
- The Apocalypse Code: Find Out What the Bible REALLY Says About the End Times . . . and Why It Matters Today (Thomas Nelson, 2007).
- Has God Spoken?: Proof of the Bible's Divine Inspiration (Thomas Nelson, 2011).
- Afterlife. Worthy Publishing. 2013. ISBN 9781617950810.

Novels

- (with Sigmund Brouwer) The Last Disciple (Wheaton: Tyndale House, 2004).
- (with Sigmund Brouwer) The Last Sacrifice (Wheaton: Tyndale House, 2005).
- (with Sigmund Brouwer) Fuse of Armageddon (Wheaton: Tyndale House, 2007).

== See also ==
- Christian countercult movement
- Christian Research Institute
