= Personal Freedom Outreach =

Evangelical countercult organization

Logo of Personal Freedom Outreach

Personal Freedom Outreach (PFO) is an evangelical countercult organization that serves to "educate Christians about the dangers and heretical doctrines of religious cults, to use the Gospel of Jesus Christ to reach members of those cults and to warn Christians of unbiblical teachings within the church itself."

Its main office is located in St. Louis, Missouri. PFO consists of seven directors. It has a board of reference, which includes Jay E. Adams, Norman L. Geisler and Ron Rhodes.

== Focus ==
PFO was founded by M. Kurt Goedelman and his wife, Angela, in 1975. PFO publishes tracts and other materials that biblically critique the Jehovah's Witnesses, Mormonism, The Way International, the Unification Church, Christian Science, Christadelphians, and other new religious movements.

PFO published the Quarterly Journal from 1981 (from 1988 under that name) until discontinuing it in 2020. It included articles on Protestant teachers and organizations which it considers marginal such as Benny Hinn, Rebecca Brown, Kenneth Hagin, Kenneth Copeland, Bill Gothard, Joyce Meyer, and the Trinity Broadcasting Network, as well as groups which it considers cultic or theologically aberrant. Back articles (including a flash drive or a CD-ROM of the entire series) are available for purchase, with some available for free viewing.

In 1996, PFO began hosting its biennial discernment conferences which deals with what it perceives as challenges to sound doctrine and a biblical worldview which face the Christian church today.

== Standards and credentials ==
PFO is a member of Evangelical Ministries to New Religions and has cosponsored a conference where they adopted a comprehensive manual, establishing guidelines in theology and ethical conduct for member organizations of the Christian countercult network. The standards are inspired by the Lausanne Congress in 1974.

Bud Press of the Christian Research Service has endorsed PFO for their "well-written and researched articles, editorials, news updates, and book reviews."

They have also been laudably evaluated in scholarly literature. Everett Shrophire and John Morehead note the wealth of information possessed by organizations as PFO and envisions a central place for them in the coming challenges to Christian mission. Paul Carden makes much the same observation.
