= Robert Passantino =

American writer (1951–2003)

- Born: August 11, 1951
- Died: November 17, 2003 (aged 52)
- Resting place: Westminster Memorial, Westminster, California
- Spouse: Gretchen Passantino
- Writing career
- Subjects: Christian apologetics, philosophy, Christian countercult movement

Robert Passantino (11 August 1951 – 17 November 2003), was an American author and journalist who wrote on subjects related to Christian apologetics, philosophy, and the Christian countercult movement.

== Career ==
Passantino lived and worked for most of his adult life in Costa Mesa, California, and received instruction in Christian teaching and practiced as a professing member of the Lutheran Church–Missouri Synod. He emerged as an apologist for faith in Evangelical Christianity during the 1970s. He and his soon-to-be wife, Gretchen, had already begun to collaborate in a ministry of Christian evangelism toward adherents of the Jehovah's Witnesses when they became acquainted with the Baptist pastor and countercult writer Walter Martin. Martin was the founder of the apologetics ministry Christian Research Institute. In 1974 Martin relocated the Institute from New Jersey to Southern California where he re-established his ministry in association with the Melodyland School of Theology. Martin officiated as the minister at the marriage ceremony of the Passantinos.

The Passantinos assisted Martin in the ministry of the Christian Research Institute for approximately five years from 1974 to 1979. In that context Martin privately taught them the rudiments of the discipline of apologetics and of investigative reporting in countercult ministry. During the 1970s and 1980s Gretchen served as an editorial assistant in preparing revised editions of some of Martin's books such as The Rise of the Cults, The Kingdom of the Cults and The Maze of Mormonism. As a couple, the Passantinos began to develop their profile as speakers in evangelical churches delivering presentations about cults and general apologetics questions concerning the existence of God and the historicity of the Bible. Together they then branched out from working at Christian Research Institute and began to operate their own apologetics and countercult ministry known as Christian Apologetics: Research and Information Service (CARIS). This ministry subsequently was renamed as Answers In Action.

They founded Answers In Action with the intent to help both Christians and non-Christians apply logic and reason to religious inquiry and to assist in answering questions about apologetics, religion, philosophy, evangelism, and theology. Robert's approach to religion was to "represent their belief system as accurately as you would have them represent yours."

Some of their initial writing appeared as researched chapters in Martin's book The New Cults. Their first co-written book Answers to the Cultist at Your Door was designed as a popular apologetics handbook for Christians. The book consisted of brief chapters about the phenomenon of cults followed by specific chapters containing evangelical apologetic responses to the doctrines taught by the Jehovah's Witnesses, Mormons, Unification Church, Hare Krishna, and the Way International.

Passantino contributed an essay on Jehovah's Witnesses in Ronald Enroth's book Evangelising the Cults. This essay centered a basic Evangelical apologetic argument that challenged the stance taken by Jehovah's Witnesses on three doctrines: the Trinity, Christ, and Salvation. He also contributed a lengthy essay that explored the theory, techniques, and application of religious research to the Evangelical Ministries to New Religions' symposium volume Contend for the Faith that was published in 1992.

During the 1990s the Passantinos emerged as critical evangelical voices on a number of questions connected to Protestant understandings about the subject of Satanism and the occult. One of their early exposés, first published in Cornerstone magazine, concerned Lauren Stratford's fraudulent claims of Satanic ritual abuse. They were highly skeptical about claims concerning Satanic ritual abuse and they argued that the basis of these claims could be explained as a combination of folklore and moral panic. In both published essays and books they called into question what they regarded as misconceptions commonly held by Christians about the beliefs and practices of Satanist groups. This included their alarm at how Satanists were often accused in Christian literature or in popular media as being perpetrators of organized crime.

Passantino's commitment to a libertarian concept of free agency led to critical evaluations of theological, philosophical, and socio-psychological forms of determinism. Against a wide current of Christian and non-Christian opinion, the Passantinos published a controversial article in Cornerstone magazine in 1994, titled "Overcoming The Bondage Of Victimization: A Critical Evaluation of Cult Mind Control Theories", in which they criticized the theoretical and empirical underpinnings of "brainwashing" and "exit counseling" models. The article was reprinted in a later edition of Martin's The Kingdom of the Cults, but has since been removed due to allegations that it did not represent Martin's own views.

The Passantinos were highly influential on other apologists as evidenced by the acknowledgements made by other apologists who refer to them concerning their input and research. This was particularly so because it was new and no one had really addressed the subject prior to the 1970s.

== Death and legacy ==
Robert Passantino died on November 17, 2003, age 52, due to cardiac arrest. He is buried at Westminster Memorial in Westminster, California. His wife, Gretchen, died from cardiac dysrhythmia as a result of undiagnosed diabetes on October 2, 2014, age 61, at Hoag Hospital Newport Beach.

In October 2007, Norman Geisler and Chad Meister published a festschrift in honor of the Passantinos, entitled Reasons for Faith: Making a Case for the Christian Faith.

== Bibliography ==
=== Books ===
- Robert Passantino, Gretchen Passantino, Answers to the Cultist at Your Door, Eugene, Oregon: Harvest House, 1981. ISBN 0-89081-275-6
- Bob Passantino & Gretchen Passantino, Witch Hunt, Nashville: Thomas Nelson, 1990. ISBN 0-8407-3129-9
- Bob Passantino & Gretchen Passantino, When the Devil Dares Your Kids: Protecting Your Children from Satanism, Witchcraft, and the Occult Ann Arbor: Servant Publications/Guildford, Surrey: Eagle, 1991. ISBN 0-86347-065-3
- Bob Passantino & Gretchen Passantino, L'ombra di Satana : come difendere i figli dall'occultismo e dalle pratiche demoniache, Messaggero, Padua, IT, 1994. OCLC 954809879 (in Italian)
- Bob Passantino & Gretchen Passantino, Satanism Grand Rapids: Zondervan, 1995. ISBN 0-310-70451-0

=== Further reading ===
- Norman L. Geisler and Chad V. Meister, editors, Reasons for Faith: Making a Case for the Christian Faith. Essays in honor of Bob Passantino and Gretchen Passantino Coburn, Wheaton, IL: Crossway Books, 2007. ISBN 1-58134-787-1

== See also ==
- Christian apologetics
- Spiritual warfare
- Satanic ritual abuse
- Brainwashing
- New religious movement
- Christian countercult movement
- Christian Research Institute
- Walter Martin
- Cornerstone (magazine)
