= Christian countercult movement =

Social movement opposing certain religious sects

The Christian countercult movement, or the Christian anti-cult movement, is a social movement among certain Protestant evangelical, fundamentalist, Christian ministries ("discernment ministries"), and individual activists who oppose religious sects that they consider cults.

== Overview ==
Christian countercult activism mainly stems from evangelicalism or fundamentalism. The countercult movement opposes movements based on theological grounds, and asserts that particular Christian sects are erroneous because their beliefs are not in accordance with the teachings of the Bible as understood by the countercult group. It also states that a religious sect can be considered a cult if its beliefs involve a denial of any of what the countercult group considers essential Christian teachings (such as salvation, the Trinity, Jesus himself as a person, the ministry and miracles of Jesus, his crucifixion, his resurrection, the Second Coming and the Rapture). Countercult activists often see cults as fundamentally similar, "most cults are basically the same" argued Dave Hunt. Hunt identified the four common traits cults shared as human godhood, rejection of moral absolutes, denial of death, and knowledge as the key to godhood or immortality.

While minor versions of the movement exist within Roman Catholicism and Eastern Orthodoxy, most of the Christian countercult movement is situated within American Evangelical Protestantism, where countercult ministries often evaluate groups whose teachings are considered to diverge from orthodox Protestant doctrine, including organizations that self‑identify as Christian as well as certain non‑Christian traditions. Targets in countercult literature sometimes include such religions as The Church of Jesus Christ of Latter-day Saints, Jehovah's Witnesses, Christian Science, Unification Church, Seventh-day Adventism, Islam, Buddhism, Hinduism, New Age movements, Paganism, Roman Catholicism, and Eastern Orthodoxy.

Countercult literature usually expresses specific doctrinal or theological concerns, often with a missionary or apologetic purpose. It presents a rebuttal by emphasizing the teachings of the Bible as understood by the countercult group against the beliefs of what they consider non-fundamental Christian sects. Christian countercult activist writers also emphasize the need for Christians to evangelize to followers of cults. Some Christians also share concerns similar to those of the secular anti-cult movement.

The movement publishes its views through a variety of media, including books, magazines, and newsletters, radio broadcasting, audio and video cassette production, direct-mail appeals, proactive evangelistic encounters, professional and avocational websites, as well as lecture series, training workshops and counter-cult conferences. Much of which is replicated from source to source. Classic literature is often rereleased in revised and updated editions.

According to Douglas E. Cowan, the identity of adherents of the Christian countercult movement is often "shaped at least as much by their opposition to other religious traditions as by devotion to their own." Cowan argues that since most readers of countercult literature will never interact with "cults," their real purpose is to demonstrate the superiority of their own beliefs over the beliefs of the other.

== History ==
=== Precursors and pioneers ===
Christians have applied theological criteria to assess the teachings of perceived non‑orthodox movements throughout church history. The Apostles themselves were involved in soteriological controversies around doctrine. Both the Acts of the Apostles (15) and the Apostle Paul’s Epistle to the Galatians (2:11–14) deals with competing definitions of what it meant to be a Christian. Some Christian teachers had urged Gentile believers to adopt circumcision and/or other aspects of the Mosaic Law in order to join the Christian community, or else they could not be saved, a dispute reflected in the Council of Jerusalem narrative. Many Christian countercult activists read the First Epistle of John as responding to early docetic or proto‑Gnostic teachings that denied Jesus’ coming in the flesh, reflected in the letter’s tests of christological confession and appeals to eyewitness testimony (1 John 1:1; 1 John 2:22; 1 John 4:2).

The early Church in the post-apostolic period was much more involved in "defending its frontiers against alternative soteriologies—either by defining its own position with greater and greater exactness, or by attacking other religions, and particularly the Hellenistic mysteries" according to Eric J. Sharpe. Much of the early Christian literature is devoted to the exposure and refutation of perceived unorthodox theology, mystery religions and Gnostic groups. Irenaeus, Tertullian, Hippolytus of Rome, and Augustine of Hippo were some of the early Christian apologists who engaged in critical analyses of unorthodox theology, Greco-Roman pagan religions, and Gnostic groups.

A major theological battle over the definition of Christianity was the Great Schism of 1054. Then in 1184, Pope Lucius III published Ad abolendam, or To abolish diverse malignant heresies, which opposed groups such as the Cathars, Waldensians, and Arnoldists who were advocating for various changes within the Catholic Church. This set the stage for the Sack of Constantinople, Albigensian Crusade, and the Inquisition; and later the Reformation and Counter-Reformation also dealt with these same theological issues of who was and wasn't a Christian.

In the Protestant tradition, some of the earliest writings opposing perceived unorthodox groups (such as the Swedenborgians) can be traced back to John Wesley, Alexander Campbell, and Princeton Theological Seminary theologians like Charles Hodge and B. B. Warfield. The first known usage of the term cult by a Protestant apologist to denote a group as heretical or unorthodox is in Anti-Christian Cults by A. H. Barrington, published in 1898.

Quite a few of the pioneering apologists were Baptist pastors, like I. M. Haldeman, or Plymouth Brethren, such as William C. Irvine and Sydney Watson. Watson wrote a series of didactic novels like Escaped from the Snare: Christian Science, Bewitched by Spiritualism, and The Gilded Lie (Millennial Dawnism), as warnings of the dangers posed by what he considered cultic groups. Watson's use of fiction to counter these perceived cults has been repeated by later novelists like Frank E. Peretti.

Early twentieth-century Protestant apologists generally applied the words "heresy" and "sects" to groups like the Christadelphians, Mormons, Jehovah's Witnesses, Spiritualists, and Theosophists. This was reflected in several chapters contributed to the multi-volume work released from 1910 to 1915 The Fundamentals, where apologists criticized the teachings of Charles Taze Russell, Mary Baker Eddy, the Mormons and Spiritualists. According to Cowan, "countercult material is rooted in scriptural and doctrinal interpretations that go back in spirit, if not always in denominational lineage, to The Fundamentals".

=== Mid-twentieth-century apologists ===
Since the 1940s, the approach of Protestant Christians was to apply the meaning of "cult" such that it included those religious groups who use other scriptures beside the Bible or have teachings and practices deviating from Protestant Christian teachings and practices.

One of the first prominent countercult apologists was Jan Karel van Baalen (1890–1968), an ordained minister in the Christian Reformed Church in North America. His book The Chaos of Cults, which was first published in 1938, became a classic among Protestant as it was repeatedly revised and updated until 1960.

After World War II the countercult movement came to prominence as a backlash against the growing variety of religious expression in America, especially that which was fueled by non-Protestant immigration from Eastern Europe and Asia; and in the United Kingdom, the repeal of the 1735 Witchcraft Act allowed for the growth of Wicca and modern Paganism.

=== Walter Ralston Martin ===
Historically, one of the most important protagonists of the movement was Walter Ralston Martin (1928–1989), whose numerous books include the 1955 The Rise of the Cults: An Introductory Guide to the Non-Christian Cults and the 1965 The Kingdom of the Cults: An Analysis of Major Cult Systems in the Present Christian Era, which continues to be influential. He became well known in conservative Christian circles through a radio program "The Bible Answer Man," currently hosted by Hank Hanegraaff.

In The Rise of the Cults, Martin gave the following definition of a cult: "By cultism we mean the adherence to doctrines which are pointedly contradictory to orthodox Christianity ... in short, is any major deviation from orthodox Christianity relative to the cardinal doctrines of the Christian faith.

As Martin's definition suggests, the countercult ministries concentrate on non-traditional groups that claim to be Christian, so chief targets have been, Jehovah's Witnesses, Armstrongism, Christian Science, and the Unification Church, but also smaller groups like the Swedenborgian Church. He defines Christian cults as groups that follow the personal interpretation of an individual, rather than the understanding of the Bible accepted by Nicene Christianity, providing the examples of the Church of Jesus Christ of Latter-day Saints, Christian Science, Jehovah's Witnesses, and the Unity Church. Martin examines a large number of new religious movements; included are major groups such as Christian Science, The Church of Jesus Christ of Latter-day Saints, Jehovah's Witnesses, Armstrongism, Theosophy, the Baháʼí Faith, Unitarian Universalism, Scientology, as well as minor groups including various New Age and groups based on Eastern religions. The beliefs of other world religions such as Islam and Buddhism are also discussed. He covers each group's history and teachings, and contrasts them with those of mainstream Christianity.

Various other Christian leaders—among them John Ankerberg and Norman Geisler—have emphasized themes similar to Martin's. Perhaps more importantly, numerous other well-known Christian leaders and pastors have accepted Martin's definition of a cult as well as his understanding of the groups to which he gave that label. Dave Breese summed up this kind of definition in these words:

A cult is a religious perversion. It is a belief and practice in the world of religion which calls for devotion to a religious view or leader centered in false doctrine. It is an organized heresy. A cult may take many forms but it is basically a religious movement which distorts or warps orthodox faith to the point where truth becomes perverted into a lie. A cult is impossible to define except against the absolute standard of the teaching of Holy Scripture.

=== Discernment blogging ===
Kenne "Ken" Silva is said by other discernment bloggers to have pioneered online discernment ministry. Ken was a Baptist pastor who ran the discernment blog "Apprising". Silva wrote many blog articles about the Emerging Church, the Word of Faith Movement, the Jehovah's Witnesses, the Gay Christian Movement, and many other groups. He started his blog in 2005 and wrote there until his death in 2014.

Silva's work paved the way for other internet discernment ministries such as 'Pirate Christian Radio', a group of blogs and podcasts founded by Lutheran pastor Chris Rosebrough in 2008, and 'Pulpit & Pen', a discernment blog founded by Baptist pastor and polemicist J. D. Hall.

== Other technical terminology ==
Since the 1980s, the term "new religions" or "new religious movements" has slowly entered into Evangelical usage alongside the word "cult." Some book titles use both terms. The acceptance of these alternatives to the word "cult" in evangelicalism reflects, in part, the wider usage of such language in the sociology of religion.

== Apologetics ==
The term "countercult apologetics" first appeared in Protestant Evangelical literature as a self-designation in the late 1970s and early 1980s in articles by Ronald Enroth and David Fetcho, and by Walter Ralston Martin in Martin Speaks Out on the Cults. "Apologetics" was defined as "the defence of the Christian faith on intellectual grounds" and was understood to mean any argument that religious belief was more rational than non-religious belief, and that Christianity was the most rational religious belief of all. In the context of the countercult movement, this meant that refuting non-Evangelical Protestant Christian religion was considered a vindication of Evangelical Christianity itself. A mid-1980s debate about apologetic methodology between Ronald Enroth and J. Gordon Melton, led the latter to place more emphasis in his publications on differentiating the Christian countercult from the secular anti-cult. Eric Pement urged Melton to adopt the label "Christian countercult", and since the early 1990s the terms has entered into popular usage and is recognized by sociologists such as Douglas E. Cowan.

The only existing umbrella organization within the countercult movement in the United States is the Evangelical Ministries to New Religions (EMNR), founded in 1982 by Martin, Enroth, Gordon Lewis, and James Bjornstad.

== Worldwide organizations ==
While the greatest number of countercult ministries are found in the United States, ministries exist in Australia, Brazil, Canada, Denmark Ethiopia, Germany, Hungary, Italy, Mexico, New Zealand, Philippines, Romania, Russia, Sweden, and Ukraine. A comparison between the methods employed in the United States and other nations discloses some similarities in emphasis, but also other nuances in emphasis. The similarities are that globally these ministries share a common concern about the evangelization of people in perceived cults and new religions. There is also often a common thread of comparing orthodox doctrines and biblical passages with the teachings of the groups under examination. In some of the European and southern hemisphere contexts, however, confrontational methods of engagement are not always relied on, and dialogical approaches are sometimes advocated.

A group of organizations that originated within the context of established religion is working in more general fields of "cult awareness," especially in Europe. Their leaders are theologians, and they are often social ministries affiliated to big churches.

=== Protestant ===
- Berlin-based Pfarramt für Sekten- und Weltanschauungsfragen (Parish Office for Sects and World Views) headed by Lutheran pastor Thomas Gandow
- Swiss Evangelische Informationsstelle Kirchen-Sekten-Religionen (Protestant Reformed Zwinglian Information Service on Churches, Sects and Religions) headed by Zwinglian parson Georg Schmid

=== Catholic ===
- Sekten und Weltanschauungen in Sachsen (Sects and ideologies in Saxony)
- Weltanschauungen und religiöse Gruppierungen (Worldviews and religious groups) of the Roman Catholic Diocese of Linz, Austria
- GRIS (Gruppo di ricerca e informazione socio-religiosa), Italy

=== Orthodox ===
- Synodic Committee about Heresies of the Greek Orthodox Church
- Center for Religious Studies in the name of Hieromartyr Ireneus of Lyon in Russia.

== Contextual missiology ==
The phenomena of cults has also entered into the discourses of Christian missions and theology of religions. An initial step in this direction occurred in 1980 when the Lausanne Committee for World Evangelization convened a mini-consultation in Thailand. From that consultation a position paper was produced. The issue was revisited at the Lausanne Forum in 2004 with another paper. The latter paper adopts a different methodology to that advocated in 1980.

In the 1990s, discussions in academic missions and theological journals indicate that another trajectory is emerging that reflects the influence of contextual missions theory. Advocates of this approach maintain that apologetics as a tool needs to be retained, but do not favor a confrontational style of engagement.

== Variations and models ==
Countercult apologetics has several variations and methods employed in analyzing and responding to cults. The different nuances in countercult apologetics have been discussed by John A. Saliba and Philip Johnson.

The dominant method is the emphasis on detecting unorthodox or heretical doctrines and contrasting those with orthodox interpretations of the Bible and early creedal documents. Some apologists, such as Francis J. Beckwith, have emphasized a philosophical approach, pointing out logical, epistemological and metaphysical problems within the teachings of a particular group. Another approach involves former members of cultic groups recounting their spiritual autobiographies, which highlight experiences of disenchantment with the group, unanswered questions and doubts about commitment to the group, culminating in the person's conversion to Evangelical Christianity.

Apologists like Dave Hunt in Peace, Prosperity and the Coming Holocaust and Hal Lindsey in The Terminal Generation have tended to interpret the phenomena of cults as part of the burgeoning evidence of signs that Christ's Second Advent is close at hand. Both Hunt and Constance Cumbey have applied a conspiracy model to interpreting the emergence of New Age spirituality and linking that to speculations about fulfilled prophecies heralding Christ's reappearance. Hunt believes that "Satan is the author of every cult and false religion".

== Prominent advocates ==
=== People ===
- John Ankerberg
- James Bjornstad
- Robert M. Bowman Jr.
- Michael R. Burgos
- Constance Cumbey
- Edward L. Dalcour
- Ed Decker
- Ronald Enroth
- Norman Geisler
- Douglas Groothuis
- Hank Hanegraaff
- Dave Hunt
- Greg Koukl
- Bob Larson
- Gordon Lewis
- Walter Ralston Martin
- Josh McDowell
- J. P. Moreland
- Robert Morey
- Robert and Gretchen Passantino
- Anthony Rogers
- John Weldon
- James R. White

=== Organizations ===
- Answers in Action — led by Robert and Gretchen Passantino
- Apologetics Index
- Apologetics Resource Center — led by Craig Branch
- Apologetics Press — led by Dave Miller
- Banner Ministries UK — led by Tricia Tillin
- Centers for Apologetics Research (CFAR)
- Christian Apologetics and Research Ministry (CARM) — founded and led by Matt Slick
- Christian Research Institute (CRI) — founded by Walter Ralston Martin
- Cult Awareness and Information Centre — founded by the late Jan Groenveld
- Dialog Center International — founded by Johannes Aagaard
- Evangelical Ministries to New Religions (EMNR)
- Institute for Religious Research (IRR)
- Midwest Christian Outreach, inc. (MCOI)
- Mormonism Research Ministry — led by Bill McKeever
- Personal Freedom Outreach (PFO)
- Pirate Christian Radio — founded by Lutheran pastor Chris Rosebrough
- Pulpit & Pen — a blog founded and written by Baptist pastor J. D. Hall
- Reachout Trust — led by Michael Thomas
- Religious Analysis Service (RAS)
- Saints Alive in Jesus
- Spiritual Counterfeits Project — led by president Mark J. Harris
- Stand To Reason — founded by Greg Koukl and Melinda Penner
- Utah Lighthouse Ministry (UTLM) — led by Jerald and Sandra Tanner
- Watchman Fellowship (WF) — founded by David Henke, led by James K. Walker

=== Literature ===
- Abanes, Richard, Cults, New Religious Movements, and Your Family, Crossway Books, Wheaton, 1998.
- Ankerberg, John; Weldon, John (1999). Encyclopedia of Cults and New Religions. Eugene: Harvest House.
- Bodensieck, Julius. Isms New and Old. OCLC 6565177
- Combs, G. H. Some Latter-Day Religions. ISBN 9781150048920
- Cumbey, Constance E. (1983). The Hidden Dangers of the Rainbow: The New Age Movement and Our Coming Age of Barbarism. Huntington House. ISBN 978-0-910311-03-8.
- Enroth, Ronald (ed)., A Guide to New Religious Movements, InterVarsity Press, Downers Grove, 2005.
- Ferguson, C. W. (1928). Confusion of Tongues. (Doran & Co). OCLC 903178756
- Geisler, Norman L.; Rhodes, Ron (1997). When Cultists Ask. Grand Rapids: Baker.
- House, H.Wayne, Charts of Cults, Sects and Religious Movements, Zondervan, Grand Rapids, 2000.
- Irvine, W. C. (1917). Heresies Exposed. (Loizeaux Brothers). ISBN 978-0872134010
- LeBar, James J. (1989). Cults, Sects, and the New Age. Our Sunday Visitor.
- Martin, Walter R. (1965). The Kingdom of the Cults. Zondervan.
- Mattes, John C. (1937). The Missionary Faces Isms. (Board of American Missions of the United Lutheran Church in America). OCLC 1982891
- McDowell, Josh; Stewart, Don (1992). Handbook of Today's Religions. Thomas Nelson.
- Rhodes, Ron, The Challenge of the Cults and New Religions, Zondervan, Grand Rapids, 2001
- Sanders, J. Oswald (1948). Heresies Ancient and Modern. (Marshall Morgan & Scott, London/Zondervan, Grand Rapids). OCLC 1055434932
- Sanders, J. Oswald (1973). Cults and isms (Revised ed.). London: Lakeland. ISBN 978-0551004580.
- Sire, James W. Scripture Twisting: Twenty Ways the Cults Misread the Bible, InterVarsity Press, Downers Grove, 1980.
- Sire, James W. The Universe Next Door 4th ed., InterVarsity Press, Downers Grove, 2004.
- Slick, Matthew J. (2002). Right Answers for Wrong Beliefs. Sovereign World.
- Tucker, Ruth A. (2004). Another Gospel: Cults, Alternative Religions and the New Age Movement. Grand Rapids: Zondervan.
- van Baalen, Jan Karel (1938). The Chaos of Cults: A Study of Present-day Isms. Grand Rapids, MI: Eerdmans Pub. Co. ISBN 978-0-8028-3278-8.
- Williams, Bryan (1997). The ABC of Cults. Christian Focus.

== See also ==
- Anti-cult movement
