= Passantino =

Passantino is a surname. Notable people with the surname include:

- George Passantino (1922–2004), American artist, teacher, and author
- Robert Passantino (1951–2003), American Christian author and journalist
- Stefan Passantino (born 1966), American lawyer
