= Churches That Abuse =

Book by Ronald Enroth

- Author: Ronald Enroth
- Language: English
- Subject: Spiritual abuse
- Genre: Christianity
- Publisher: Zondervan
- Publication date: 1992
- Publication place: United States
- Pages: 231
- ISBN: 978-0-310-53292-7
- OCLC: 24502109
- Followed by: Recovering from Churches That Abuse

Churches That Abuse, first published in 1992, is a best-selling Christian apologetic book written by sociologist Ronald M. Enroth. The book documents cases of churches and other organizations said to be spiritually abusive and the effects these groups have had on their members. Enroth does not limit abuse to smaller minority groups or new religious movements, he states that "spiritual abuse can take place in the context of doctrinally sound, Bible-preaching, fundamentalist, conservative Christianity". Enroth outlines the backgrounds of the leaders of these groups and explains how the groups evolved to the point of becoming spiritually abusive.

== Reception ==
The book has been praised by Margaret Thaler Singer, Paul R. Martin, and Maxine Pinson. Ruth Tucker, countercultist and former professor at Calvin Theological Seminary, objected to the research methods used by Enroth. Jerome G. Blankinship, in The Christian Century, argued that the book would have benefited from an index and a more academic approach to the subject, but overall still approves of the work. In Christianity Today, Robert W. Patterson believes the book is an exposé for evangelical Christian groups that spiritually abuse its adherents, but he criticizes Enroth for not asking the "hard, theological question: Are these abusive churches really Christian?"
