= Stand to Reason =

Stand to Reason may refer to:

- Stand to Reason (UK charity), a mental health charity
- Stand to Reason (apologetics organization), a Christian apologetics organization founded by Greg Koukl
