= The Challenge of the Cults and New Religions =

2011 book by Ron Rhodes

- Book cover, 2001 ed.
- Author: Ron Rhodes
- Language: English
- Subject: Cults, New religious movements
- Publisher: Zondervan
- Publication date: September 1, 2001
- Publication place: United States
- Media type: Print (Hardback)
- Pages: 400 pp
- ISBN: 978-0-310-23217-9

The Challenge of the Cults and New Religions: The Essential Guide to Their History, Their Doctrine, and Our Response is a Christian countercult non-fiction book about cults and new religious movements by Ron Rhodes. The book was published by Zondervan on September 1, 2001. The book defines cults and new religions by examining case studies of twelve groups chosen by Rhodes. The book includes a foreword by Lee Strobel, author of the book The Case for Christ.

== Reception ==
In a review, John Moryl writes that the book addresses the topic of cults from the viewpoint of an evangelical Christian. Moryl questioned Rhodes's inclusion of certain groups in the book, including the Church of Jesus Christ of Latter-day Saints, Jehovah's Witnesses, Unitarian Universalism, and Freemasonry, and attributed this to a unique evangelical perspective.

The Challenge of the Cults and New Religions has been used as a reference work in Christian college courses at Emmanuel Bible College, Lincoln Christian College and Seminary, and the University of Valley Forge, formerly Valley Forge Christian College.
