= Institute for Religious Research =

United States Christian organisation

The Institute for Religious Research (IRR) is an American Christian apologetics and counter-cult organization based in Cedar Springs, Michigan. It declares itself to be a non-denominational, non-profit Christian foundation for the study of religious claims, and was formerly known as Gospel Truths Ministries. IRR is a member of Evangelical Ministries to Non-Christian Religions (EMNR, created in 2022 to supersede Evangelical Ministries to New Religions) and was headed by Luke P. Wilson until his death in 2007. Robert M. Bowman Jr., who joined the staff in 2008 as executive director, in 2022 became the organization's president.

== Overview ==
IRR's primary focus is on The Church of Jesus Christ of Latter-day Saints and Jehovah's Witnesses, although its publications contain profiles on other religions, such as Zen Buddhism, Islam, and Roman Catholicism.

Peggy Fletcher Stack, religion columnist for the Salt Lake Tribune, discussed IRR and its 2002 documentary critique of the Book of Abraham, which Mormons traditionally have believed is a divinely inspired translation by Joseph Smith of a text by the Genesis patriarch Abraham that Smith claimed was contained on an Egyptian papyrus in his possession. IRR's documentary, entitled The Lost Book of Abraham: Investigating a Remarkable Mormon Claim, featured Robert K. Ritner and other Egyptologists who argued that the papyrus in question had nothing to do with Abraham. The University of Utah's student newspaper observed that no Latter Day Saints agreed to be interviewed for the film. In an article for a journal published by Brigham Young University's Foundation for Ancient Research and Mormon Studies, John Gee considered IRR's 1992 publication By His Own Hand Upon Papyrus: A New Look at the Joseph Smith Papyri by Charles M. Larson, also regarding the Book of Abraham, to be a "deliberate deception". On the other hand, the main contention of IRR’s book and documentary, which was that the Book of Abraham is not a translation from the Egyptian papyrus, had already been presented in several articles by Ritner and other scholars in the independent periodical Dialogue: A Journal of Mormon Thought.

In 2005, IRR criticized Richard Mouw of Fuller Seminary for claiming that evangelicals generally had sinned against Mormons by misrepresenting what they believed. IRR agreed that some evangelicals had committed such offenses, but they argued, along with two dozen Utah pastors and other evangelical leaders, that Mouw's comments were unfair overgeneralizations.

In 2005, over a year prior to the release of a film adaptation of Dan Brown's novel The Da Vinci Code, the Baptist Press noted IRR's Ronald V. Huggins and his apologetic analysis of the book.
