= Jan Groenveld =

Australian anti-cult activist (1945–2002)

- Born: 1945; Australia
- Died: 22 October 2002 (aged 57); Queensland, Australia
- Occupation(s): Founder, Cult Awareness and Information Centre
- Spouse: Simon Groenveld
- Children: 7

Jan Groenveld (1945 – 22 October 2002) was an Australian Christian countercult activist. She was a member of the Latter-day Saints Church and the Jehovah's Witnesses. She spent fifteen years in these and other organisations before leaving them in 1975 and resolving to make more information about what she saw as cults available to the general public.

== Anti-cult activities ==
Groenveld first began providing information about groups she referred to as cults to the public and counselling affected individuals in 1979. In 1980, she founded the Freedom in Christ ministry, whose purpose was to counsel former members of controversial groups and provide information about coercive religious sects.

Groenveld founded the Cult Awareness and Information Centre (CAIC) in 1990. Groenveld's CAIC website was started in 1991.

Groenveld was particularly active against the Jehovah's Witnesses, modern Satanism, and the occult, but she also combatted the influence of other groups – like Scientologists – in Australia.

Groenveld first met Steven Hassan in 1993, when she brought him to Brisbane, Australia, from the United States for a seminar. Hassan educated Groenveld as to the "serious potential for doubt and lack of veracity in satanic ritual abuse stories".

== Presence in media ==
In 1999, a Brisbane tabloid, The Sunday Mail, interviewed Groenveld on the likelihood that more destructive cults would show up in Australia during 1999 before the new millennium. The publication and others credited Groenveld as a "cult specialist". Other Australian publications like The Courier-Mail, a Brisbane tabloid, and The Mercury, a tabloid in Hobart, titled her a "cult expert." She warned the publication about a cult called the Twelve Tribes Mission, believing them to possess militant tendencies. She warned that "There are people out there all over the place who would like to be another Jim Jones", referring to the Peoples Temple suicides.

Groenveld's work has also been cited in Robert L. Snow's Deadly Cults: The Crimes of True Believers.

== Death ==
Jan Groenveld died in October 2002, and was survived by her husband, 3 sons, 2 daughters and 2 foster daughters.

== See also ==
- Christian countercult movement
- Anti-cult movement
