= Watchman Fellowship =

Christian countercult organization

The Watchman Fellowship (WF) is a Christian countercult organization, which according to its website, maintains an independent, non-denominational Christian research and apologetics ministry focusing on new religious movements, cults, the occult and the New Age. Based in Arlington, Texas, it was founded by former teacher turned apologist David Henke in 1979 and has offices in six states and one in Romania.

The mission of the Watchman Fellowship has three primary goals: to educate the community, to equip the church, and to evangelize to cults. The Fellowship encourages evangelical Christians to gather accurate information about groups that deviate from "essential Christian doctrines." Its current president is James K. Walker, a former Mormon. The organization offers four day "cult awareness conferences" and other events which it states are "designed to impact the entire community". They also visit local congregations so spread cult-awareness. They mainly target The Church of Jesus Christ of Latter-day Saints, Jehovah's Witnesses, and the New Age movement. Rather than objecting to paranormal activity on atheist or skeptical grounds, the Watchman Fellowship argues that spirits may be real and malevolent.

In 2007, it contributed 45,000 items from the organization's own collection to the Southwestern Baptist Theological Seminary.

== See also ==
- Christian countercult movement
