= Walter Ralston Martin =

American minister, author (1928–1989)

The Reverend Walter Ralston Martin
- Born: September 10, 1928; Brooklyn, New York, U.S.
- Died: June 26, 1989 (aged 60)
- Notable work: The Kingdom of the Cults

Walter Ralston Martin (September 10, 1928 – June 26, 1989) was an American Baptist Christian minister and author who founded the Christian Research Institute in 1960 as a parachurch ministry specializing as a clearing-house of information in both general Christian apologetics and in countercult apologetics. As the author of the influential The Kingdom of the Cults (1965), he has been dubbed by the conservative Christian columnist Michael J. McManus, the "godfather of the anti-cult movement".

== Birth and early years ==
Martin was born in Brooklyn, New York, to George Washington Martin II (1876–1948) and Maud Ainsworth (1892–1966). His father was a prominent figure in the legal profession who served as an assistant District attorney, before working as a criminal trial lawyer. In 1920 George Martin became a county court judge and presided over cases involving some of the notorious Murder Inc. criminals.

Martin's mother, Maud Ainsworth, was born in Chicago to Joseph Ainsworth and Annie Young. She was one of several children born of that marriage, but was put up for adoption. She was adopted by her uncle and aunt James McIntyre (theatrical actor) (1857–1937) a vaudevillian (one partner of the blackface duo, "Thomas Heath and Jim McIntyre"), and Emma Maude Young (1862–1935), a dancer and balladeer (known on stage as "Maude Clifford" and "Maud Clifton").

Martin was raised in the Bedford-Stuyvesant area of Brooklyn, and was the youngest of six children. In his earliest years the family lived on Macdonough Street, and then from 1930 onwards on Bainbridge Street, Brooklyn. In the mid-1940s he attended The Stony Brook School where he obtained his high school diploma.

== Continuing education ==
Dr. Martin held four earned degrees including a Master of Arts in Philosophy from New York University, where he was a student alongside television evangelist D. James Kennedy. Kennedy confirmed the fact that Martin had completed all of the coursework for his doctorate, with the exception of his dissertation. He subsequently obtained a Ph.D. in 1976 from California Coast University, which was approved (not accredited) by the state of California at the time the degree was awarded.

== Early career ==
Martin's career as an apologist began at the age of fifteen after being baptized in Hegemen Chapel at The Stony Brook School (Stony Brook, NY). Martin has indicated in various book dedications and in audio recorded lectures how he was mentored by Frank Gaebelein (Headmaster, The Stony Brook School), Wilbur M. Smith (1894–1976) – author of the apologetic text Therefore Stand – and the Presbyterian Bible teacher Donald Grey Barnhouse (1895–1960).

Martin's relationship with Barnhouse as his mentor grew over the years, and he was appointed as a regular columnist to Eternity magazine (1955–60). Barnhouse's support for Martin's research and teaching abilities resulted in the reassessment of Seventh-day Adventist theology, raising the profile of his early ministry in the Evangelical movement. He also worked for a time as a research associate for the National Association of Evangelicals.

Martin was ordained as a minister of the Regular Baptists in 1951, but this was revoked in 1953 because of his remarriage. However, Martin met with the key pastor involved in this revocation and a restoration agreement was apparently reached, as Martin began marrying couples on television and continuing in public pastoral roles with the full knowledge of the Baptist denomination. His status as a minister has been the subject of much controversy but his daughter, Jill Martin Rische, has made more information available that puts much of the controversy to rest. Walter Martin served as a pastor in various churches in New York and New Jersey in the 1950s and 1960s. He also became a regular teacher of Bible study classes at Barnhouse's Church in New York City. In later years Martin would serve as a preacher and Bible teacher at Melodyland Christian Center and then at Newport Mesa Christian Center in California.

=== Evangelical-Adventist controversy ===
Perhaps the greatest public controversy of his early career arose from his studies of Seventh-day Adventist theology. From its earliest days until the 1950s, the Seventh-day Adventist Church was regarded by Evangelical Christians and mainstream Protestants as either an extreme sect or heretical cult. Martin had initially accepted the prevailing Protestant opinion about the heretical status of the Seventh-day Adventists. He indicated his opposition to Adventist teachings in a brief paragraph in the inaugural edition of his book The Rise of the Cults, published in 1955.

However, he reversed his views after a series of interviews with various leaders of the Seventh-day Adventist Church, and on reading Adventist literature. Martin reported his initial findings to Barnhouse, and between 1955 and 1956 a series of small conferences were held, with Barnhouse and Martin meeting Adventist leaders like T. E. Unruh and LeRoy Froom. Barnhouse and Martin then published some of their findings in a series of articles that appeared in Eternity between September and November 1956. The standpoint taken by Barnhouse and Martin was that Adventists were largely orthodox on central doctrines, but heterodox on lesser doctrines, and so could be classified as belonging in the Evangelical camp. Martin later expanded his position in his 1960 book-length treatment, The Truth About Seventh-day Adventism. Martin's book carried an explanatory foreword by Barnhouse and a statement from H. W. Lowe who was the chairman of the Biblical Study and Research Group of the General Conference of Seventh-day Adventists. While Lowe did not agree with Martin's criticism of the church's distinctive doctrines he nonetheless commended the book for providing a "fair and accurate statement of Adventist teachings." A committee of Adventist leaders themselves wrote and published a companion book, Seventh-day Adventists Answer Questions on Doctrine, in 1957. While many Adventists welcomed the overtures of Barnhouse and Martin, there were other Adventists who questioned the position taken by church leaders in the volume Questions on Doctrine.

In the late 1950s and early 1960s Evangelical opinions were divided over the Martin-Barnhouse stance on the Adventists. Some, like E. Schuyler English, supported Martin, some such as John Gerstner urged a sober and fair hearing, while others, such as Louis Talbot, J. K. van Baalen, Harold Lindsell and Anthony Hoekema, opposed his view. As the controversy ensued among Evangelicals Martin found it was necessary to restate and defend his position and to reply to his critics. To that end Martin reproduced much of the text of his 1960 book, together with critical replies in an appendix "The Puzzle of Seventh-day Adventism" in his 1965 textbook The Kingdom of the Cults. Martin later updated the appendix in the 1985 edition of Kingdom of the Cults, and since his death the editors of the posthumous editions of 1997 and 2003 have continued to update it.

=== Early writings ===
From 1955 to 1965 Martin enjoyed a relationship with Zondervan publishers where he was appointed as director of cult apologetics publications. During this period Zondervan released several publications about cults under his direction, with at least eight books and four booklets written by Martin. His earliest countercult books included Jehovah of the Watchtower, The Christian Science Myth, The Christian and the Cults and The Maze of Mormonism.

In his first handbook, The Rise of the Cults, he labelled Jehovah's Witnesses, the Theosophical Society, Mormonism, Christian Science, the Unity School of Christianity, and Father Divine as cults, with an exhortation to the church to treat such as an important mission-field. Most of the contents of his earliest books reappeared in his major textbook The Kingdom of the Cults, which was first released in 1965. In the 1985 version of the book, in which he called Scientology a cult, he contrasted several of L. Ron Hubbard's teachings of Scientology to those in the Christian Bible. Martin highlighted Scientology's multiple-god and reincarnation ideas, Hubbard's concepts that the Christ story and hell were both legends, and that repentance for sin is abhorrent—denouncing Hubbard as a false prophet.

Martin's primary approach to assessing cults was to focus on what he saw as doctrinal issues, particularly those concerning the person, nature, and work of Jesus Christ. Martin emphasized research and quoted directly from the teachings of the opposing denominations; which he labelled cults, trying to challenge their claims with Christianity by pointing out what he saw as "Biblical errors" in their theology.

Martin built a reputation as an authority figure on cults based upon integrity. His role as a columnist in Eternity magazine allowed him the freedom to address other topics such as basic Christian doctrines, the theology of Karl Barth, the problem of alcoholism, and reviewing books. His basic approach in apologetics was that of an evidentialist.

Throughout his writing career Martin had articles published in other periodicals including Christianity Today, United Evangelical Action, The Christian Librarian, Christian Life, Christian Research Newsletter, Logos Journal, Moody Monthly, and Our Hope.

=== Christian Research Institute ===
In 1960 Martin established the Christian Research Institute in New Jersey, and then in 1974 relocated it to Southern California. In its earliest years Martin's colleagues who were associated with Christian Research Institute included Walter Bjorck, James Bjornstad, Floyd Hamilton, and Shildes Johnson, many of whom went on to publish countercult books.

Through this parachurch organization Martin built up a reference library of primary source material, and sought to train Christians in the art of apologetics and evangelism. He developed a bureau of speakers, and from the early 1960s conceived of the need for a computerized data base of apologetic information. Martin's prescient advocacy of using computer technology for apologetic purposes led to a major conference, the All-Europe Conference on Computer Technique for Theological Research held in Austria in September 1968. This became the subject of the book Computers, Cultural Change and the Christ, which was written by Martin's friend and colleague John Warwick Montgomery.

In 1978 he established a ministry periodical known as Forward, which was redesigned in 1987 as Christian Research Journal. Martin mentored several figures who have become prominent apologists in the Christian countercult movement including Craig Hawkins, Bob and Gretchen Passantino, Elliot Miller, John Weldon, Kenneth Samples, Ron Rhodes, Rich Poll, Dan Schlesinger, Ron Carlson, Paul Carden, and Robert M Bowman Jr. Many of the people who have established ministries in the Christian countercult movement regard Martin as its father. One indicator of the high esteem in which he was held is that at least twelve books have been dedicated to him. Scores of ministries on cults and apologetics have also begun as a result of Martin and his ministry.

=== Broadcaster, debater and lecturer ===
Martin was also a radio broadcaster who began this side of his ministry on Barnhouse's program. In the mid-1960s Martin regularly appeared as a guest panelist on The Long John Nebel Show, and then founded his own program known as "The Bible Answer Man". Between the mid-1960s until his death in 1989 Martin debated in public various non-Christians such as atheist author-activist Madalyn Murray O'Hair and Hugh Schonfield, theologians of Liberal Christianity like Thomas J. J. Altizer and Bishop John Shelby Spong, and new religious commentators like Roy Masters. He appeared many times on the John Ankerberg television show debating advocates of Freemasonry, the Baháʼí Faith, and other groups.

In the earliest years of his ministry Martin traveled frequently with Billy Graham and World Vision Founder Bob Pierce, addressing thousands in open air church meetings about the theological problems posed by the cults. Martin always emphasized the importance of analysis and primary source materials in determining the beliefs of groups like Christian Science, Jehovah's Witnesses, Seventh-day Adventists, the Church of Jesus Christ of Latter-day Saints, Spiritualists, Father Divine, Unity School of Christianity and Herbert W. Armstrong's Worldwide Church of God. In 1958 he spoke throughout East Asia and in Ghana, and in 1961 in Northern and Western Europe.

The popularity of Martin's ministry coincided with the Jesus People movement of the early 1970s and the rise of the countercultural interest in East Asian religions and esoteric pathways. As occult interests surfaced in the counterculture, and also as other religious movements and groups like the Hare Krishna, Unification Church, and Children of God emerged, Martin's value as a Christian speaker increased.

Martin utilized the new technology of cassette tapes, and disseminated many of his public lectures about apologetics questions and new religious movements groups to thousands worldwide. Several albums were released on The World of the Cults, The World of the Occult, The New Cults, How To Witness to Jehovah's Witnesses, and How to Witness to Mormons. Other albums tackled general apologetics To Every Man An Answer, and topical problems such as abortion, homosexuality and women's liberation (Martin Speaks Out). He later appeared in a series of six films produced by Vision House called Martin Speaks Out on the Cults.

During the 1980s Martin spoke in churches and parachurch conferences in Australia and around the world, Brazil, Kenya and New Zealand. His final book dealt with New Age spirituality.

Martin maintained a part-time role as a lecturer in various liberal arts and Bible colleges including The King's College, Melodyland School of Theology in Anaheim, California, and was for many years a board member of Gordon-Conwell Theological Seminary. In 1980 he joined John Warwick Montgomery in promoting apologetics through the Master of Arts program at the Simon Greenleaf School of Law. He died on June 26, 1989, in San Juan Capistrano, California, at the age of 60.

== Controversies ==
In the 1980s, Martin was involved in critical debates over the positive confession success theology (also called Word of Faith) of Christian charismatic teachers such as Kenneth Copeland and Kenneth Hagin. While Martin was critical of these teachers' claims concerning their views of Christ, healing, faith, and prosperity, he believed in the perpetuity of charismatic spiritual gifts in the Church. To that end, Martin presented his positive appraisal of spiritual gifts in several audio lectures and by editing with chapter endnotes, a fresh reprint edition of nineteenth-century evangelist Dwight L. Moody's book Secret Power.

Some opponents have made claims that Martin did not have a valid doctorate. Mr. and Mrs. Robert Brown of Arizona, members of The Church of Jesus Christ of Latter-day Saints, stated that California Western University, now known as California Coast University (CCU) was not accredited at the time the degree was awarded. In addition some opponents of Martin claim he purchased his doctorate from CCU, which they claim was a degree mill. Martin completed all the coursework at New York University, which is also an accredited school. Furthermore, California Coast University also offers fully accredited programs, being approved by the State of California since 1974. Such approval is currently granted by the California Bureau for Private Postsecondary Education. It, however, received national accreditation only in 2005, from the Distance Education and Training Council (DETC). It obtained this status after a study by the US General Accounting Office (GAO), which sought to provide national accreditation to schools that offered high-quality education, which concluded that CCU was never a diploma mill and never committed wrongdoing.

== Works ==
- Martin, Walter Ralston, and Norman H. Klann, Jehovah of the Watchtower (Biblical Truth Publishing, Paterson, New Jersey, 1953).This was revised and republished by Zondervan, Grand Rapids, 1956; revised again and republished by Moody Press, Chicago, 1974; and final revision published by Bethany House, Minneapolis, 1981. ISBN 0-87123-267-7
- Walter B. and Norman H. Klann, The Christian Science Myth (Biblical Truth Publishing, Paterson, New Jersey, 1954). This was revised and republished by Zondervan, Grand Rapids, 1955.
- Martin, Walter R., The Rise of the Cults (Zondervan, Grand Rapids, 1955). This text was revised and published by Zondervan, 1957, then revised and published by Vision House in 1977 and 1980; and finally completely revised and reissued under a new title Martin Speaks Out on the Cults (Vision House, Santa Ana, 1983). ISBN 0-88449-103-X
- The Christian and the Cults (Zondervan, Grand Rapids, 1956).
- Christian Science. Modern Cult Library Booklet Series. (Zondervan, Grand Rapids, 1957).
- Jehovah's Witnesses. Modern Cult Library Booklet Series. (Zondervan, Grand Rapids, 1957).
- Mormonism. Modern Cult Library Booklet Series. (Zondervan, Grand Rapids, 1957).
- Unity. Modern Cult Library Booklet Series. (Zondervan, Grand Rapids, 1957).
- The Truth About Seventh-day Adventism (Zondervan, Grand Rapids, 1960).
- "Seventh-day Adventism" in The Challenge of the Cults, Harold Lindsell & Others (Zondervan, Grand Rapids, 1960), pp. 36–44.
- Essential Christianity: A Handbook of Basic Christian Doctrines (Zondervan, Grand Rapids, 1962). This was republished by Vision House, Santa Ana, 1975, and reissed with minor additions by Vision House, 1980. ISBN 0-88449-043-2
- The Maze of Mormonism (Zondervan, Grand Rapids, 1962). This was substantially expanded in a new revised edition published by Vision House, Santa Ana, 1978. ISBN 0-88449-017-3
- The Kingdom of the Cults (Zondervan, Grand Rapids, 1965). This text was revised and republished by Bethany Fellowship, Minneapolis, 1968. Further revised editions were published by Bethany in 1977 and 1985. Two very different posthumous editions have been published by Bethany, one under the editorship of Hank Hanegraaff, 1997, and then one under the editorship of Ravi Zacharias, 2003. The 2003 edition is approved of by Martin's family. ISBN 0-7642-2821-8
- (ed). UFO: Friend Foe or Fantasy (Christian Research Institute, Wayne, New Jersey, 1968).
- Screwtape Writes Again (Vision House, Santa Ana, 1975). ISBN 0-88449-022-X
- Abortion: Is It Always Murder? (Vision House, Santa Ana, 1977). ISBN 0-88449-066-1
- The Riddle of Reincarnation (Vision House, Santa Ana, 1977). ISBN 0-88449-065-3
- (ed). The New Cults (Vision House, Santa Ana, 1980). ISBN 0-88449-016-5
- (ed). Walter Martin's Cults Reference Bible (Vision House, Santa Ana, 1981). ISBN 0-88449-075-0
- The New Age Cult (Bethany House, Minneapolis, 1989). ISBN 1-55661-077-7
- "Ye Shall Be as Gods" in The Agony of Deceit, edited by Michael S. Horton (Moody Press, Chicago, 1990), pp. 89–105. ISBN 0-8024-8776-9
- and Jill Martin-Rische, Through the Windows of Heaven (Broadman & Holman, Nashville, 1999). ISBN 0-8054-2031-2
- and Jill Martin Rische & Kurt Van Gorden, The Kingdom of the Occult (Thomas Nelson, Nashville, 2008). ISBN 1-4185-1644-9
- Moody, Dwight L. Secret Power, Introduced and edited by Walter R. Martin (Regal Books, Ventura, 1987). ISBN 0-8307-1219-4
- Montgomery, John Warwick, Computers, Cultural Change and the Christ (Christian Research Institute, Wayne, New Jersey, 1969).

=== Articles ===
- "Father Divine ... King of Cultists", Eternity (August 1955), pp. 8–9 and 42-44.
- "The Layman and the Cults", Eternity (August 1956), pp. 22–23 and 38.
- "Are Seventh-day Adventists Evangelicals?", Christian Life (October 1956), pp. 58–60.
- "Seventh-Day Adventism Today", Our Hope, 63/5 (November 1956), pp. 273–284.
- "The Truth About Seventh-day Adventism: Its Historical Development from Christian Roots", Eternity (October 1956), pp. 6–7 and 38-39.
- "What Seventh-day Adventists Really Believe", Eternity (November 1956), pp. 20–21, and 38-43.
- "Adventist Theology vs. Historic Orthodoxy", Eternity (January 1957), pp. 12–13 and 38-40.
- "Jehovah's Witnesses and the Gospel of Confusion", Eternity (September 1957), pp. 22–23 and 36-37.
- "The Christian and the Law," Eternity, June 1958, pp. 19 & 36.
- "More About Karl Barth", Eternity (November 1959), pp. 21–23, 38 and 49.
- "Reversing his Field" (Book review of Edgar Goodspeed, Matthew Apostle and Evangelist) Eternity, December 1959, p. 40.
- "What Can We Do about the Terrifying Trend of Alcoholism?", Eternity (August 1960), pp. 18–20, and 33-34.
- "Cult Study" [Book review of John Gerstner, The Theology of the Major Sects], Christianity Today, 21 November 1960, pp. 38–39.
- "Seventh-Day Adventism," Christianity Today, 19 December 1960, pp. 13–15.
- "Grackles and Bluebirds" (Tribute to Donald Grey Barnhouse) Eternity (March 1961), p. 12.
- "An Answer to the Hippies" [Book review of Lit-Sen Chang, Zen-Existentialism], Christianity Today, 5 December 1969, pp. 17–18.
- "SENT/EAST: Electronic Answering Search Technology", The Christian Librarian, 14/1 (October 1970), pp. 3–6.
- "Christian Research Institute", The Christian Librarian, 14/1 (October 1970), pp. 15–18.
- "Personal Responsibility", The Christian Librarian, 14/2 (December 1970), pp. 10–12.
- "Cults The Spirits of Error", Christian Life (April 1978), pp. 22–25 and 63-65.
- "John Todd: The Illuminati", Logos Journal, 9 (March 1979), pp. 67–69.
- "Charismatics and the Cult of Mary" (Part 1), Forward, 3/1 (Spring 1980), pp. 6–7.
- "Charismatics and the Cult of Mary" (Part 2), Forward, 3/2 (Fall 1980), pp. 3 & 7.
- "Meditation as God Intended", Moody Monthly (December 1986), pp. 34–35.
- "The PTL Scandal and Biblical Repentance," Christian Research Journal, Summer 1987, p. 31.
- "Satanism on the Rise," Christian Research Newsletter, 2/5 (1989), p. 5.

== See also ==
- Anti-cult movement
- Christian countercult movement
