= Ronald Enroth =

American sociologist (1938–2023)

- Born: October 28, 1938; Weehawken, New Jersey, U.S.
- Died: February 3, 2023 (aged 84); Hilo, Hawaii, U.S.
- Occupations: Sociologist, researcher, author, professor

Academic background
- Education: University of Kentucky
- Thesis: Patterns of Response to Rural Medical Practice and Rural Life in Eastern Kentucky (1967)

Ronald M. Enroth (October 28, 1938 – February 3, 2023) was an American professor of sociology at Westmont College in Santa Barbara, California, and an evangelical Christian author of books concerning what he defined as "cults" and "new religious movements" and important figure in the Christian countercult movement.

== Early life ==
Born in Weehawken, New Jersey, Enroth was raised in Ridgefield, New Jersey, and attended Dwight Morrow High School in nearby Englewood, New Jersey. After his family moved to New Paltz, New York, he transferred to New Paltz High School.

== Academic career ==
Enroth was a graduate of Houghton College and earned his M.A. and Ph.D. at the University of Kentucky. He began his career in teaching sociology during his doctoral studies, and held the post of an instructor at Westmont College from 1965 to 1967. He was appointed as an assistant professor (1967–71), and then associate professor (1971–76) at Westmont. He became a full professor in 1976.

Although Enroth's doctoral work was in the field of medical sociology, he pursued research and teaching in the sociology of religion, new religious movements, social problems, and the sociology of deviant behavior. He held memberships within four professional organizations: American Sociological Association, Society for the Scientific Study of Religion, American Academy of Religion, and the Association for the Sociology of Religion.

Enroth won the Leo J. Ryan commemorative award in 1982. He was the Social Science editor for the periodical the Christian Scholar's Review (1987–1990). He also served on the editorial advisory board of the secular anti-cult movement periodical the Cultic Studies Journal. He also served for a number of years on the board of reference for the ministry the Spiritual Counterfeits Project in Berkeley, California. In 1987 he delivered the Tanner Annual Lecture at the Trinity Evangelical Divinity School, Deerfield, Illinois. In 1994, Westmont College awarded Enroth twice for both Faculty Researcher of the Year and also Teacher of the Year in Social Sciences.

== Praise ==
In general, Enroth's writings were acknowledged in Christian circles as significant contributions on the subject of "cults". In 1992 J. Gordon Melton made special mention of Enroth as an important figure in the Christian countercult movement. Unlike most of the apologists who concentrate on doctrinal questions, Enroth was distinguished as one of the few writers in the movement to both hold credentials in sociology and to apply sociological tools in his analyses. Melton stated that Enroth was "the single most widely read of the Evangelical Christian counter-cult writers."

== JPUSA Controversy ==
In 1993, Enroth's book Recovering from Churches That Abuse set off a "firestorm of debate among religious scholars," centered around a chapter on the group Jesus People USA which included several stories of alleged abuse within the group.

James T. Richardson, former president of the Association for the Sociology of Religion and currently professor of sociology and Judicial studies (University of Nevada, Reno), criticized Enroth's book and research methods in an issue of JPUSA's Cornerstone magazine, writing in part:

Enroth's book can be viewed as another in a long line of popular books that teach people how to become good victims by reinterpreting their past. Ironically, this thoroughly non-sociological book makes use of a sociological truth--that people are constantly reinterpreting their past to make their view of that past more functional for their present--as he delivers the message that people's problems are not really their fault. Someone else is always to blame. This line of thought is controversial from several perspectives, of course, including the theological and the therapeutic. … Enroth reminds the reader several times that he is a sociologist, thus implying that he is doing sociology in the book, but this slim volume is not sociological. There is no attempt to sample properly, or to limit generalizations in any explicit way. There is no effort to discuss the issue of self-serving accounts that plague all such books of this 'anticult' bent, and there is a glossing over of the writer's own particular religious persuasion. Furthermore, there is virtually no recognition of the considerable scholarly research that might be used to counter the apparent thesis of Enroth, who seems to believe that religious groups that require heavy discipline and commitment should be avoided in favor of less demanding mainstream groups.

JPUSA elders, who attempted to convince Enroth to remove the chapter prior to the release of the book, referred to the chapter as "poison in the well." Ruth Tucker, a professor at Trinity Evangelical Divinity School also defended JPUSA saying Enroth was "sadly misdirected and his research methods seriously flawed."

In defense of Enroth's work, Paul R. Martin, the director of Wellspring Retreat and Resource Center, one of the few residential treatment centers in the world for former members of cults and "abusive groups," supported Enroth's findings, saying that his facility had seen a flood of requests for help from former members and that JPUSA "displays virtually every sign that I watch for in overly authoritarian and totalistic groups."

Ronald Enroth himself responded to the controversy (some of which had occurred prior to the release of the book) in the book itself, in part with:

There has been much correspondence between leaders of the Covenant Church and JPUSA and me since I began to do the research for this book. They have questioned the integrity of my reports, the reliability of my respondents, and my sociological methodology, but I have conducted more than seventy hours of in-depth interviews and telephone conversations with more than forty former members of JPUSA. They have also largely discounted the reports of abusive conditions past and present in the JPUSA community. … Unwilling to admit serious deficiencies and insensitivity in their pastoral style, the leaders of JPUSA have instead sought to discredit the former members who have cooperated with my research efforts.

As a result of the book's chapter on JPUSA, according to a later newspaper article, "scores" of members read it and decided to leave the group.

== Later life and death ==
Enroth retired from Westmont College after forty-seven years of teaching and moved to Hawaii, where he died on February 3, 2023, at the age of 84.

== Bibliography ==
Enroth has written and edited the following books:

- The Jesus People with Edward E. Ericson & Calvin B. Peters (Eerdmans, 1972)
- The Gay Church with Gerald Jamison (Eerdmans, 1974)
- Youth, Brainwashing and the Extremist Cults (Zondervan Publishing House, 1977)
- A Guide to Cults & New Religions (editor) (InterVarsity Press, 1983)
- Why Cults Succeed Where The Church Fails with J. Gordon Melton (Brethren Press, 1985)
- The Lure of the Cults & New Religions (Christian Herald Books, 1979)
- Evangelizing the Cults (editor) (Servant Publications, 1990)
- Churches That Abuse (Zondervan Publishing House, 1992)
- Recovering From Churches That Abuse (Zondervan Publishing House, 1994)
- A Guide to New Religious Movements (editor) (InterVarsity Press, 2005)
