= Melodyland Christian Center =

Church in Anaheim, California, United States

Coordinates: 33°48′23″N 117°54′45″W

Melodyland Christian Center was a church in Anaheim, California, that was located a short distance east of the Disneyland Resort. The Melodyland Theater and surrounding campus started as a theater in the round and later became an evangelical Christian church led by Pastor Ralph Wilkerson. The Melodyland theater and all the buildings on the church campus were demolished in 2003. Part of the Anaheim GardenWalk was later built on the site.

== History ==
The 3,200 seat Melodyland Theatre, at 400 West Freedman Way (now Disney Way), Anaheim was built by Leo Freedman. The theater's first production, Annie Get Your Gun, opened on July 2, 1963, with Sammy Lewis and Danny Dare as producers.

In 1969 the property encompassing Melodyland was put up for auction. Christian Center Church, headed by Ralph Wilkerson, bought the property and called the church Melodyland Christian Center, also retaining the theater's original sign. Later, Melodyland would have a School of Divinity called Melodyland School of Theology. The school later changed its name to Southern California Christian High School or SCCHS for short before being absorbed by Eastside Christian Schools in Fullerton, California. The congregation moved to Tustin in the late 1990s. The original Melodyland building was demolished in 2003 to allow for the construction of the Anaheim GardenWalk mall.
