= Greg Koukl =

American radio talk show host, author, and speaker

Gregory Koukl (born June 10, 1950) is a Christian apologist and radio talk show host. He is the founder of the Christian apologetics organization Stand to Reason.

== Education and work ==
Koukl received an M.A. in Philosophy of Religion and Ethics from Talbot School of Theology, and also an M.A. in Christian apologetics from Simon Greenleaf School of Law.

In 1993 Koukl founded Stand to Reason, an organization dedicated to training those supporting his Christian viewpoints to defend their faith with "knowledge, wisdom, and character". Stand to Reason produces a weekly radio program, audio podcasts, articles, and video materials. Stand to Reason ended its radio program on KBRT, its flagship station, on 6 December 2015. Stand to Reason sponsors mission trips in which students encounter those with opposing points of view, including Mormons and atheists.

His book "Tactics: A Game Plan for Discussing Your Christian Convictions" was cited as a must read on how to share Christian beliefs and defend Christianity in an article on the Christian Post. Koukl is known in particular for what he calls the "Columbo tactic" (named after the fictional detective) of always asking one more question.

== Books ==
- Beckwith & Koukl (1998). Relativism: Feet Firmly Planted in Mid-Air. Baker Books. ISBN 978-0-801-05806-6.
- Koukl, Gregory (1999). Precious Unborn Human Persons. Stand to Reason. ISBN 978-0-967-35840-6.
- Koukl, Gregory (2001). Making Abortion Unthinkable: The Art of Pro-Life Persuasion. ISBN 978-1-930-83604-4.
- Koukl, Gregory (2009). Tactics: A Game Plan for Discussing Your Christian Convictions. Zondervan. ISBN 978-0-310-28292-1.
- Koukl, Gregory (2017). The Story of Reality: How the World Began, How It Ends, and Everything Important that Happens in Between. Zondervan. ISBN 978-0-310-52504-2.

Contributions to other books

- Beckwith, Craig, Moreland (2014). To Everyone an Answer—A Case for the Christian Worldview. InterVarsity Press. ISBN 978-0-830-82735-0.

Radio broadcast

- Koukl, Gregory. "Capital Punishment: Is Man a Machine". Archived from the original on 11 April 2012.
