= The Kingdom of the Cults =

1965 book by Walter Ralston Martin

- Cover of the first edition
- Author: Walter Ralston Martin
- Language: English
- Subject: New religious movements
- Published: 1965
- Publication place: United States
- Media type: Print (Hardcover and Paperback)
- Pages: 703 (2003 revised edition)
- ISBN: 978-0764228216

The Kingdom of the Cults, first published in 1965, is a reference book of the Christian countercult movement in the United States, written by Baptist minister and counter-cultist Walter Ralston Martin. As of 2019, the book is in its sixth updated edition (hardback ISBN 9780764232657).

== Summary ==
Martin examines a large number of new religious movements; included are major groups such as Christian Science, The Church of Jesus Christ of Latter-day Saints, Jehovah's Witnesses, Armstrongism, Theosophy, the Baháʼí Faith, Unitarian Universalism, and Scientology, as well as minor groups such as Swedenborgianism and Rosicrucianism, plus various New Age and groups based on Eastern religions. The beliefs of other world religions such as Islam and Buddhism are also discussed.

Martin covers each group's history and teachings, contrasting them with those of mainstream Protestant Christianity. In an appendix titled "The Puzzle of Seventh-day Adventism," Martin partially rehabilitated the reputation of the Seventh-day Adventist Church in the midst of the ongoing Evangelical-Adventist controversy.

In contrast with some standard secular definitions of the word, Martin narrowly defines a cult in theological terms as "a group of people gathered about a specific person—or person's misinterpretation of the Bible," while admitting that in spite of "distorting Scripture" such groups' beliefs may contain "considerable truths" that have biblical support but have become de-emphasized by mainstream Christianity, such as divine healing and prophecy.

== Influence and reception ==
By 1989, The Kingdom of the Cults had sold over 500,000 copies and was one of the ten best-selling American spiritual books. The book has been described as being regarded by evangelicals as "the authoritative reference work on major cult systems for nearly 40 years." However, it has been criticized by members of some of the groups it discusses, particularly Mormons, who object that their faith should be labeled a "cult".

There have been several editions over the years with some changes. In the 1985 edition the Nation of Islam was not mentioned, and in the 2003 edition it was put back in a chapter on Islam itself. After Martin's death, a revised and expanded edition was issued that listed Ravi K. Zacharias as "general editor."

== Editions ==
- Martin, Walter Ralston (1965). The Kingdom of the Cults. Grand Rapids Michigan: Zondervan Publishing House.
- Martin, Walter Ralston (1966). The Kingdom of the Cults. Zondervan Publishing House.
- Martin, Walter Ralston (1967). The Kingdom of the Cults. Marshall, M & S.
- Martin, Walter Ralston (1968). The Kingdom of the Cults. Minneapolis: Bethany Fellowship.
- Martin, Walter Ralston (1977). The Kingdom of the Cults. The definitive work on the subject. Completely updated and revised. Minneapolis: Bethany Fellowship. ISBN 9780871233004.
- Martin, Walter Ralston (1982). The Kingdom of the Cults. Bethany House Pub. ISBN 9780871233004.
- Martin, Walter Ralston (1985). The Kingdom of the Cults. Bethany House Pub. ISBN 9780871237965.

=== Published posthumously ===
- Martin, Walter Ralston (1992). The Kingdom of the Cults. Limited edition. Bethany House Publishers. ISBN 0-87123-796-2.
- Martin, Walter Ralston (1997). Hanegraaff, Hank (ed.). The Kingdom of the Cults. Bethany House Publishers. ISBN 9781556617140.
- Martin, Walter Ralston (2003). Zacharias, Ravi; Martin, Jill; Rische, Kevin (eds.). The Kingdom of the Cults. The definitive work on the subject. Completely updated for the 21th century. Bethany House Publishers. ISBN 9780764228216.
- Martin, Walter Ralston (2006). The Kingdom of the Cults.
- Martin, Walter Ralston (2009). The Kingdom of the Cults.
- Martin, Walter Ralston (2019-05-21). Rische, Jill Martin; Van Gorden, Kurt (eds.). The Kingdom of the Cults. The definitive work on the subject (6 ed.). Bethany House Publishers. ISBN 9780764232657.
- Martin, Walter Ralston (2019). Rische, Jill Martin (ed.). The Kingdom of the Cults Study Guide.
- Martin, Walter Ralston (2019-05-21). The Kingdom of the Cults. Handbook. Bethany House Publishers. ISBN 9780764232718. LCCN 2019946584.
- Martin, Walter Ralston (2021). The Kingdom of the Cults. MP3. Tantor Audio. ISBN 9798200207954.
