= Robert M. Bowman Jr. =

American theologian (born 1957)

Robert M. Bowman Jr. (born August 10, 1957) is an American Evangelical Christian theologian specializing in the study of apologetics.

== Biography ==
Bowman received the M.A. in Biblical Studies and Theology from Fuller Theological Seminary in 1981, did doctoral studies in Christian Apologetics at Westminster Theological Seminary, and earned his Ph.D. in Biblical Studies in 2015 at the South African Theological Seminary. From 2006 to 2008 he was manager of Apologetics and Interfaith Evangelism for the North American Mission Board (based in Alpharetta, Georgia), an agency of the Southern Baptist Convention. From 2008 to 2018 he served as the executive director of the Institute for Religious Research, an independent, evangelical nonprofit organization (formerly located in Grand Rapids, now based in Cedar Springs, Michigan). In 2022 he rejoined the staff and became the organization's president.

== Writings ==
Bowman is the author of over sixty articles and of fifteen books. Five of those books he co-authored with Kenneth D. Boa, an Oxford-trained scholar; two of these books (An Unchanging Faith in a Changing World and Faith Has Its Reasons) won the Gold Medallion Book Award. Four of his earliest books were theological critiques of the teachings of Jehovah's Witnesses.

- Jesus' Resurrection and Joseph's Visions: Examining the Foundations of Christianity and Mormonism (2020; ISBN 978-1-947929-11-1)
- Faith Thinkers: 30 Christian Apologists You Should Know (2019; ISBN 978-1-947929-08-1)
- What Mormons Believe (2012; ISBN 978-0-8308-3770-0)
- Putting Jesus in His Place: The Case for the Deity of Christ (2007, with J. Ed Komoszewski; ISBN 978-0825429835)
- Sense and Nonsense about Heaven and Hell (2007, with Kenneth D. Boa; ISBN 978-0310254287)
- Sense and Nonsense about Angels and Demons (2007, with Kenneth D. Boa; ISBN 978-0310254294)
- Faith Has Its Reasons: Integrative Approaches to Defending Christian Faith (2001, 2006, with Kenneth D. Boa; ISBN 978-1932805345)
- 20 Compelling Evidences That God Exists (2002, with Kenneth D. Boa; ISBN 978-1589193062)
- The Word-Faith Controversy: Understanding the Health and Wealth Gospel (2000; ISBN 978-0801063442)
- An Unchanging Faith in a Changing World (1998, with Kenneth D. Boa; ISBN 978-0785273523)
- Jehovah's Witnesses (1995; ISBN 978-0310704119)
- Orthodoxy and Heresy: A Biblical Guide to Doctrinal Discernment (1992; ISBN 978-0801010248)
- Understanding Jehovah's Witnesses: Why They Read the Bible the Way They Do (1991; ISBN 978-0801009952)
- Why You Should Believe in the Trinity: An Answer to Jehovah's Witnesses (1989; ISBN 978-0801009815)
- Jehovah's Witnesses, Jesus Christ, and the Gospel of John (1989; ISBN 978-0801009556)
