= Great Commission Association of Churches =

Organization of churches

- Founded: 1965 with no official name 1970 as The Blitz Movement; 1983 as Great Commission International; 1989 as Great Commission Association of Churches; 2005 as Great Commission Churches; 2020 GCC Dissolved
- Founder: Jim McCotter; Herschel Martindale; Dennis Clark
- Type: Evangelical Christian Church Association
- Purpose: Planting and building churches
- Location: Columbus, Ohio
- Origins: Plymouth Brethren
- Region served: International
- Members: 0 Dissolved 2020
- Official language: English
- Key people: Herschel Martindale; John Hopler; Rick Whitney; Dave Bovenmeyer; Tom Short; Mark Darling; Brent Knox; Chris Martin; Dennis Clark
- Website: https://www.gccweb.org/

The Great Commission Association of Churches (GCC) was a fellowship of independent evangelical Christian churches founded from campus outreach activity begun in 1970; the GCC board voted to dissolve the association in 2020.

== History ==
The movement began as a campus outreach called "The Blitz" in 1970 and later formalized as Great Commission International (GCI) in 1983; in 1989 it incorporated as the Great Commission Association of Churches (GCAC).

=== Roots ===
In 1965, 20-year-old Jim McCotter (James Douglas McCotter) left his home in Colorado Springs, Colorado and moved to Greeley, Colorado in an attempt to recreate the New Testament Church, a church model he believed no existing Christian denomination was emulating fully. McCotter, whose family's religious background was with the Plymouth Brethren, has stated that his desire to form the movement stemmed from his belief that God had shown him in the Bible's Book of Acts a strategy instructing Christians on how God wanted to use church planting to "reach the world for Christ" within one generation. This strategy came to be known as the "Heavenly Vision", and was a cornerstone belief of the early movement. McCotter also believed that the Bible was instructing every Christian to emulate the actions of the Apostle Paul's life as he imitated Christ and that this was the model life for all Christians to imitate based upon Paul's exhortation in 1 Corinthians 11:1. Early members believed they were returning to the lost lifestyle of the first century Christians. After arriving in Greeley, McCotter attended and began sharing his faith at the University of Northern Colorado campus. According to McCotter, by the end of the first year 12 people had joined him, after 1966 there were thirty, and in the following years it "doubled and tripled." The movement eventually spread to other cities in Colorado, as well as Las Cruces, New Mexico, in the form of missions or "works". McCotter dropped out of college to focus on ministry full-time, and was planning to move down to Pueblo, Colorado to continue his efforts; however, in 1967, at the height of the Vietnam War, he was drafted into the United States Army. During basic training at Fort Polk, Louisiana, McCotter met Dennis Clark and on McCotter's return from Vietnam in 1970 he met Herschel Martindale. Clark and Martindale would become two of the founders of the movement in the summer of 1970.

=== "Blitz Movement" Begins ===
In 1970, under the leadership of Jim McCotter, Dennis Clark, Herschel Martindale, and others, approximately 30 college-age Christians embarked on a summer-long evangelical outreach known as "The Blitz" to several university campuses in the Southwestern United States. These 2 or 3 day events used singing, tract distribution, and sidewalk canvassing to draw crowds and spread the word. As the movement expanded, additional mission outreaches and training conferences took place. In the summer of 1973, nearly 1,000 people attended the movement's national conference. The conference was followed by the "blitzing" of fifteen new campuses and by the end of 1973, about 15 "works" had been established. In the late 1970s, selected newspapers, former members, and select watchdog groups began to publicly criticize the movement's practices. This continued into the 1980s and early 1990s. (See the Criticism section for more information.)

=== Widmar v. Vincent ===
In 1981, a freedom of religion case was won by the student group of a church (Cornerstone) which was a part of the Great Commission Church movement. The University of Missouri at Kansas City did not allow its facilities to be used by college students for religious meetings. In an 8–1 ruling, the United States Supreme Court stated that the First Amendment Establishment Clause did not require the university to limit the use of its facilities by religious groups.

=== Great Commission International ===
In 1983, Great Commission International (GCI) was formed. Led by Jim McCotter and Dennis Clark, it was formed to provide services such as publishing and fund raising for the developing association. That summer, GCI launched the first summer Leadership Training conference which attracted college students for a summer of intensive training in evangelism and discipleship. The LT program continues today under the leadership of Great Commission Ministries. In 1985, GCI undertook a mass outreach and expansion effort called Invasion '85. During this effort, teams were sent to 50 college campuses with a goal of starting new campus ministries. While many "works" were successfully established during Invasion '85, most of them did not continue. According to GCAC, "team members were not properly trained nor were they given adequate support." GCI continued to be scrutinized in some newspapers and by former members of the movement, and in 1985 several conferences were held with the purpose of helping former members of churches that were part of GCI "recover from the emotional and psychological damage they'd experienced" while in the movement. Shortly thereafter, Wellspring Retreat and Recovery Center, a cult and abusive religion recovery center, was formed by several ex-members of the movement. In late 1986, founder Jim McCotter announced his resignation from GCI, stating a desire to utilize his entrepreneurial abilities in an attempt to influence secular media for Christ. Two years later, McCotter moved to Florida and has not since attended a church affiliated with the movement, with the exception of the 2003 Faithwalkers conference. At this point in GCAC history, its churches claimed approximately 5,000 members.

=== GCAC and GCM formed ===
In 1989, Great Commission International changed its name to the Great Commission Association of Churches (GCAC), and is known today as Great Commission Churches (GCC). Also in 1989, Great Commission Ministries (GCM), under the initial leadership of Dave Bovenmyer, was formed. Its aim was to "mobilize people into campus ministry by training them to raise financial support and by equipping them for campus ministry." In 1996, the Internal Revenue Service selected GCM as a test case to eliminate the common practice known as "deputation," (which allows non-profit mission organizations to raise funds for its activities, while allowing contributors to claim income tax deduction). The IRS reaffirmed GCM's non-profit status.

== 2005–2020 ==
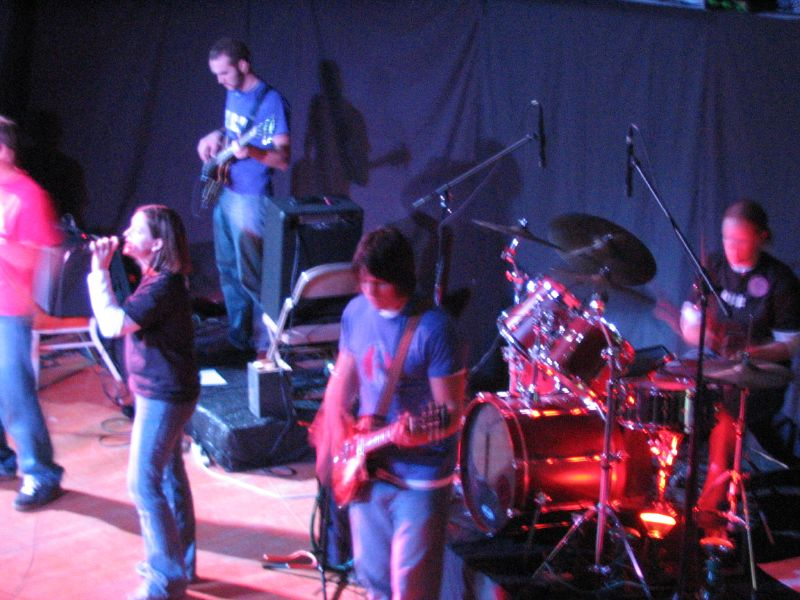
The Rock worship team at Curtiss Hall on the Iowa State campus. Photographer: Kirsten Hill

Approximately 60 churches in the United States are affiliated with GCA, and approximately a dozen internationally in Europe, Asia and Latin America. Together these churches claimed over 43,000 members in 2005. According to a 2001 Ivy Jungle report as cited by John Schmalzbauer of Missouri State University, there were 6,900 college students involved in GCM. GCA maintains an administrative support staff in Orlando, FL. GCC publishes the periodical "Faithwalkers Journal" and other doctrinal papers, written principally by pastors within the movement. Regional and national conferences are attended by both leaders and members of churches in the movement. Conferences include Faithwalkers, Ignite, High School Leadership Training (HSLT), and National Pastor's Conferences.

== Great Commission Church Dissolution ==
On 13 July 2020 the GCC Board issued a statement announcing that the organization would be dissolved by the end of 2020, explaining that the association had served as "scaffolding" for a network of churches and that many member churches and pastors were now stable and able to relate independently.

== Partnerships ==
GCAC, and its associated bodies, is a member of several evangelical organizations including the National Association of Evangelicals, Evangelical Council for Financial Accountability, Evangelical Fellowship of Missions Agencies, and the Interdenominational Foreign Mission Association. GCAC works with a number of organizations that share its aims including Samaritan's Purse, Global Pastors Network, Wycliffe Hall, Oxford, and Wycliffe Bible Translators. GCM maintains a Council of Reference. These members do not run or manage GCM, but affirm their support for the ministry and serve as a source of counsel for GCM leaders. Chi Alpha, the campus ministry of the Assemblies of God, has suggested parents check out GCM, among eight others, if there is no Chi Alpha on their students' campus and counts GCM among its founding ministries.

== Affiliated organizations ==
=== Reliant (Formerly Great Commission Ministries) ===
Great Commission Ministries' official logo

Great Commission Ministries (GCM) was founded as the subsidiary campus and international mission agency for Great Commission Association of Churches, and began to serve other organizations without a mission agency of their own beginning in 2006. In 2004, Boundless webzine (associated with Focus on the Family) published an article listing GCM as one of the "ten top college ministries across the U.S.", saying that their strategy of "seeking to incorporate students into the starting of a church based campus ministry" "has been effective to attract and involve thousands of students." The article also stated that "Their outstanding Board of Directors and dedicated staff are committed to world missions and leadership development and thus supplying the church around the world with a fresh supply of equipped laborers." Following the 2007 Virginia Tech massacre, GCM's Virginia Tech campus church New Life Christian Fellowship (NLCF) received widespread media coverage. NLCF pastor Jim Pace, a GCM missionary, was a guest on Larry King Live and Good Morning America, CNN created a video of their memorial service. Several newspapers, magazines, and radio shows carried quotes from NLCF pastors. (Note: New Life Christian Fellowship was a member of Great Commission Ministries Churches in 2007. Ecclesia Church Network which claims NCLF as a member, was founded the summer after the shooting. Great Commission Ministries Churches, as of 2012, is known as Collegiate Church Network (or Collegiate). It is a separate church network from Great Commission Churches. NCLF has dual membership in Collegiate and Ecclesia. See campus ministries.) The largest financial supporters of Great Commission Ministries are individual donors. In 2002, 92% of GCM's income came from contributions of this nature. GCM missionaries are required to raise 100% of their support goal, which includes base salary, benefits, and ministry expenses. Twelve percent of all funds raised goes toward administrative overhead. GCM has been a member of the ECFA since 1992. GCM now goes by the name Reliant.

=== Other affiliates ===
Great Commission Latin America's official logo

Great Commission Latin America (GCLA) is a Latin American outgrowth of Great Commission Ministries founded in 1974 by Daniel B. Sierra, a Cuban-American missionary from Florida Bible College and directed by Nelson Guerra since 1981, a native Honduran and former president of the Honduran National Association of Evangelicals. As of 2007 it consisted of 25 member churches.

Great Commission Churches (GCC) is a fellowship of churches in the Great Commission Association, which helps coordinate ministry activities in the U.S., including Great Commission Leadership Institute (GCLI), GCLI "Going Deeper" Regional conferences, Faithwalkers National Conferences, and national GCA Pastor's Conferences. GCM missionaries Steve and Danelle Nelson have written for Great Commission Churches' Faithwalkers Journal.

Great Commission Northwest (GCNW) is a regional association of North American GCA churches, spanning from Chicago to Seattle.

GCC has several regional subsidiaries as well, including GCC Regional Ministries (GCC-RM) and Great Commission Northlands (GCN) (which coordinates church planting, leadership training, and church coaching in Minnesota, North Dakota, and Wisconsin).

=== Past ministries and organizations ===
During the 1980s, a number of ministries and organizations were formed and then discontinued by the late 1980s in an attempt to "penetrate key centers of influence," including: Americans for Biblical Government, Great Commission Academy, Alpha Capital, THEOS (The Higher Education Opportunity Service), Communication Forum, and Students for Origins Research. A campus ministry similar to the current Great Commission Ministries (GCM) existed prior to 1989 under the name of Great Commission Students (GCS).

=== Publications ===
Under the direction of Jim McCotter in the 1970s and 1980s, the movement started several magazines and newspapers, including The Cause, America Today, Today's Student, U.S. Press, Potential, and the Life Herald. These projects were short-lived or were discontinued in the late 1980s. Several Relevant Magazine articles have also been written by GCM staff and members. In February 2006, Exodus International published a Greg Van Nada article from the GCM Connect Newsletter in Exodus Impact.

== Criticism ==
=== Criticism in Newspapers ===
In March 1978, the first public criticism of the movement and its practices was reported by the Iowa State Daily, after an Iowa State student who was later diagnosed as a manic-depressive spent 18 days in a psychiatric ward, followed by another 23-day stay in another, due to emotional problems his psychiatrist attributed to involvement with the movement's Iowa State campus ministry. Subsequent criticism of the movement appeared eight months later in a front-page article by the Des Moines Register, in which campus pastors expressed concerns over "manipulation" and "a kind of brainwashing." Throughout the late 1970s, 1980s, and early 1990s, similar criticisms were published by newspapers in Ohio, South Carolina, Maryland, New York, Illinois, Toronto, nationally across Canada, and in other locations, particularly those near college campuses where the movement was active. The movement was often accused of authoritarian practices, and some accounts quoted former members and cult researchers who accused the movement's leaders of "brainwashing" and "mind-control" techniques.

=== Criticism in Research Papers, Books, and Magazines ===
Two research papers critical of the movement were published between 1988 and 1995, as were three books that included the movement in its lists of "abusive Christian groups", one with a sequel which mentions dissatisfaction with the group's efforts. In a 1992 Group Magazine article by Ronald Enroth, one ex-member described the movement as fostering a "learned helplessness" in members. In light of developments since 1994, Dr. Ronald Enroth no longer has concerns about Great Commission Churches.

=== Cult and "Aberrant" Labels ===
In 1988, the movement was classified as a cult by the American Family Foundation (AFF), the (pre-Scientology) Cult Awareness Network, and the Council on Mind Abuse. The Council on Mind Abuse ceased its existence in 1992, while the CAN was taken over by Scientologists in 1996 after years of legal issues. The movement was classified as an "aberrant Christian group" by Martin J. Butz in his 1991 research paper and by Paul Martin, a former leader of the movement, in 1993. However, the charge Great Commission has at any time in its history been a "cult" has been dismissed by Great Commission Churches. In addition, William Watson, a writer of the book "A Concise Dictionary of Cults and Religions" defended Great Commission. Watson wrote in a letter dated August 1, 1991, "I am convinced that the Great Commission Association of Churches, formerly GCI, is not, and has not been a cult. In 2002, ex-member Larry Pile said he would not refer to the movement as a cult, but instead as a "Totalist Aberrant Christian Organization". Pile believed the movement was "Christian because they hold orthodox beliefs", and yet "aberrant on secondary issues." In a 2006 statement, Pile stated that many of the concerns expressed by him in the past over aberrant teaching is "old news" and "no longer characterizes GCAC/GCM, at least not systemically," while acknowledging that concerns, expressed to him from 2000 to 2006 by members and former members, reveal "residual problems at least in individual churches and leaders. Furthermore, many of the old problems have still not been addressed fully or forthrightly." In December 2011, Larry Pile released a statement of reconciliation. Pile stated that "GCC has resolved to my satisfaction all issues of concern" and he requested that "the past remain the past." Pile went on to say "I urge that current members and leaders of GCC be evaluated fairly, according to how they teach and live out their faith in the present." Along with Pile's statement, GCC released an account of the reconciliation process on its website.

=== Maryland political controversy ===
In 1986, 12 members of a GCI church ran for state office in Maryland, prompting attention from the national media, and speculation from Maryland political leaders that it was a concerted effort by GCI to enter the political arena. None of the GCI church members running for office were thought to have had prior political aspirations, yet many filed papers to run on the same day, June 30. In a Washington Post article, GCI leaders denied formal involvement, stating that each person's decision to run was made independent of GCI leadership. On September 11, 1986, The Montgomery County Sentinel reported that none of the candidates won election.

=== University of Guelph Ban ===
In 1989 the movement's campus ministry was banned from the University of Guelph after university officials cited concerns about the group's practices.

== Responses to criticism ==
=== Tom Short, 'Setting Great Commission's record straight' ===
On April 21, 1988, "The Diamondback" published an article by GCI's National Student Director, Tom Short, in which he defended the movement against an article written by Denny Gulick, professor of Mathematics at the University of Maryland, which charged that the movement was a "destructive cult." He also defended the movement against charges from the Cult Awareness Network that the movement was a cult, stating that CAN was the avowed enemy of anyone who claimed to have a life-changing experience and implying that Gulick had not looked into GCI with an open mind as had his mother.

=== 1991 GCC Statement of Church Error ===
According to GCC, "During the late 1980s and early 1990s a concerted effort was made to reach out to people who felt that they had been hurt by GCI and its churches. At the initial urging of Tom Short, the GCI leaders and pastors published a paper as part of a plan to follow the Biblical standard of humility and reconciliation in relationships. This effort towards reconciliation, formally called Project CARE, was led by Dave Bovenmyer and was instrumental in building unity with Christians within and outside of Great Commission."

In 1991, GCAC released a public statement acknowledging church error and weakness. In the statement, GCC clarified its position on many issues, and admitted responsibility for mistakes grouped into two categories; problems resulting from a "prideful attitude", and problems as "a result of a misapplication or misinterpretation of Scripture." Issues discussed in the statement include:

- Failing to distinguish between a command, and principle, and preference.
- Authoritarian and insensitive leadership.
- An "elitist attitude" towards other Christian organizations.
- Excessive and unbiblical church discipline.
- Improper response to criticism.
- Lack of emphasis on formal education.
- A belief that every man should become an elder.
- Treating dating as a sin.

The statement also listed steps taken, or to be taken, to correct these issues.

=== Response to statement ===
As of 1994, many former members felt the Weakness Statement was not enough or that it left out other concerns, according to Ronald Enroth's book Recovering From Churches that Abuse. In light of developments since 1994, Dr. Ronald Enroth no longer has concerns about Great Commission Churches. Dr. Paul Martin, director of Wellspring and a former member of GCI, is quoted extensively in the book and also notes his statements are now out of date.

=== 2010 Explanation of Criticisms ===
In September 2010, John Hopler, Director of Great Commission Churches, posted an Explanation of Criticisms on the GCC website. This document serves to give insight into the continued criticisms of the movement, and specifically those against Jim McCotter. Hopler does not believe the criticisms stand up to examination.

== List of campus ministries ==
The below list of ministries and churches is out of date as of the dissolution of the GCC in 2020 but was an accurate partial list of associated ministries and churches before the dissolution.

=== Collegiate Church Network ===
- Cornerstone Christian Fellowship (Illinois State University)
- Illini Life (University of Illinois)
- The Revolution (Ball State University)
- Riverview Church (Michigan State University)
- New Life Church (University of Michigan)
- New Life Church (Eastern Michigan University)
- New Life Church (Wayne State University)
- The Rock (University of Missouri)
- H_{2}O Church – BGSU (Bowling Green State University)
- H_{2}O Church – Kent (Kent State University)
- H_{2}O Church – OSU (Ohio State University)
- H_{2}O Church – Cincinnati (University of Cincinnati)
- H_{2}O Church – Toledo (University of Toledo)
- H_{2}O Church – Pittsburgh (University of Pittsburgh)
- Fellowship Church (Texas A&M University)
- 2.42 of San Marcos (Texas State University)
- Hope Fellowship Church (University of North Texas)
- Taproot Church (University of Texas San Antonio)
- New Life Christian Fellowship (Virginia Tech)

=== Great Commission Churches ===
- REACH, The Firehouse Church (Auraria Campus: University of Colorado Denver, Community College of Denver, Metropolitan State University)
- The Rock Ft. Collins (Colorado State University)
- The Rock (University of Northern Colorado)
- Gator Christian Life (University of Florida)
- Awaken Church and Jacksonville Christian Life (University of North Florida)
- Seminole Christian Life (Florida State University)
- The Rock @ COD, Glen Arbor Community Church (College of DuPage)
- Campus Fellowship (Alive), Walnut Creek Community Church (Drake University)
- The Rock, Stonebrook Community Church (Iowa State University)
- Grace Campus Church (Purdue University)
- The Rock (University of Minneapolis)
- Grace at State, Grace Community Church (North Carolina State University)
- H_{2}O (University of North Dakota)
- The Rock (University of Nebraska–Lincoln)
- The Rock (University of Nebraska Omaha)
- Longhorn Life (University of Texas)
- River City Network, Riverbend Community Church (University of South Carolina)
- The Edge (University of Wisconsin-Eau Claire)
- Emerge (West Virginia University)
- South LA Christian Life (University of Southern California)
- Destiny Church of Jacksonville and Jacksonville Church Network (Jacksonville, Florida)

== See also ==
- Biblical inerrancy
- Christian right
- Intelligent design
- Jesus movement
- Jim McCotter
- Larry Pile
- Modern methods of evangelism
- Paul R. Martin
- Shepherding Movement
- Tom Short
- Wellspring Retreat and Resource Center
