= Jim McCotter =

James Douglas McCotter
- Born: April 27, 1945 (age 80); Wisconsin, USA
- Occupation(s): former CEO, Maverick Jets, Inc.
- Spouse: Barbara McCotter
- Children: 9
- Website: Greenwood Fellowship

James Douglas McCotter (born April 27, 1945) is an American entrepreneur, the former CEO of Maverick Jets and controversial founder of the "Blitz Movement" which became the Great Commission Association of Churches. He was also a member of the Council for National Policy as well having been a holder of national and international media interests.

== Childhood ==
Born on April 27, 1945, James Douglas McCotter spent his childhood in Texas and Colorado. He was raised by an originally Methodist family, which later joined the conservative evangelical Plymouth Brethren Church. McCotter graduated from high school in Colorado Springs.

== Religious Pursuits ==
In 1965, a 20-year-old McCotter left his home in Colorado Springs, Colorado and moved to Greeley, Colorado in an attempt to recreate the "New Testament Church", a church model he believed no existing Christian denomination was emulating fully. After arriving in Greeley, McCotter began sharing his faith primarily at the University of Northern Colorado campus, which he also began attending. According to McCotter, by the end of the first year 12 people had joined him, after 1966 there were thirty, and the following years it "doubled and tripled." Eventually a handful of men moved out to other cities in Colorado, as well as Las Cruces, New Mexico, to start other "works" as they were then called. The size of these "works" were most likely small, as McCotter has stated that, "Most people wouldn't have called them churches. Most people never knew we were churches." Though McCotter was not ordained by the Plymouth Brethren, he claimed the authority of an apostle.

McCotter dropped out of college to focus on ministry full time, and was planning to move down to Pueblo, Colorado to continue his efforts; however, in 1967, at the height of the Vietnam War, he was drafted into the United States Army. During training, at a base in Fort Polk, Louisiana, McCotter met Dennis Clark, to whom he imparted his vision of God's "strategy" to reach the world.

=== Returns to the U.S. ===
Jim McCotter returned to Colorado after he had completed his service in Vietnam. In May 1970, Dennis Clark returned from the service as well and joined Jim in Colorado. On a bus in 1970, while attending a conference, Jim struck up a conversation with Herschel Martindale, who would become one of the early leaders of the movement in the summer of 1970. In the early 1970s, he helped start an evangelical movement with other young Christians at a Colorado university. He spent a summer touring Southwest universities, setting up campus-based churches, which according to one member church, were characterized by a literal interpretation of the Bible, a "strong expectation of the soon return of the Lord, and an aggressive emphasis on evangelism." Over the next decade, the movement spread into the wider community.

=== "The Blitz" ===
In 1970, under the leadership of Jim McCotter, Dennis Clark, Herschel Martindale, and others, approximately 30 college-age Christians embarked on "The Blitz" - a summer-long evangelistic outreach to several university campuses in the Southwestern United States. "The Blitz" was named after the Blitzkrieg military offensive of World War II.

During the next few years, additional mission outreaches and training conferences took place as the movement expanded to many more university campuses. By the summer of 1973, nearly 1,000 people attended the movement's national conference, held on an eastern campus. Fifteen new campuses were "Blitzed" that summer by hundreds of recruits, fresh from the conference, and the movement continued to gain strength. By the end of 1973, there were about 15 "works" established. The movement would eventually become known as Great Commission International, and then later Great Commission Association of Churches.

==== Child rearing controversy ====
In 1978, McCotter was criticized in the Des Moines Sunday Register for a statement he made during a sermon about child rearing. The sermon was based upon the Bible verse Proverbs 20:30 ("Blows that wound cleanse away evil; strokes make clean the innermost parts.") In it, McCotter said, "When you discipline, this verse indicates, as others do, that you want to do it so it wounds. Now, when you say ‘wounds,’ it doesn’t mean that you have a bloody mess on your hands necessarily. It doesn’t mean that you have a child ‘wounding’ like he has a broken leg.... And he may, and often will be, black and blue. My children have been many times. And it cleans evil from them."

ISU child development professor Sedahlia Crase was quoted as saying, "What he advocates on this tape is just poor child-rearing practice in every sense of what we know now. Besides that, it's illegal to injure a child and bruising is injuring them. I’m upset that he goes around preaching these kinds of things." McCotter responded to Crase's comments with, "She might have taken what I said out of context, but I would stand by the idea that the Bible very strongly advocates spanking children. Of course, they also need to be loved and played with."

==== Dating teaching controversy ====
McCotter has been criticized for his teachings on dating. In a 1984 Great Commission International (GCI) teaching, McCotter taught that dating was forbidden by the Bible because, "What we call 'dating,' the Bible may call 'partiality' (James 2:9). What we call 'boyfriend/girlfriend,' the Bible may call a 'clique' or a 'faction' (Galatians 5:20)." According to former member and researcher Larry Pile, quoted in a 1988 newspaper article, "[In GCI] You’re practically engaged by the time you have what you normally consider a date. I do know of cases where couples were actually broken up by the leadership."

=== Resignation ===
In late 1986, McCotter announced his resignation from GCI, stating a desire to utilize his entrepreneurial abilities in an attempt to influence secular media for Christ as his reason. Two years later, Jim moved to Florida and has not attended a church affiliated with the movement since that time, with the exception of the 2003 Faithwalkers conference. In an interview with New Zealand's North and South, McCotter denied involvement with Great Commission, saying, "I personally grew up as a Protestant and have tried to contribute most of my life to Christian or charitable organizations. However, I am not remotely involved in any way, in any "Church Movement" as you suggest, although I do go to church."

=== References in Churches That Abuse book ===
In Ronald Enroth's 1992 book Churches That Abuse, Great Commission International, and specifically Jim McCotter, are given as examples of an "abusive church" situation. Specifically, McCotter is criticized for authoritarian leadership practices during his time with Great Commission:

In abusive-church situations, the "spiritual family" often displaces the biological family, and church leaders assume the role of surrogate parents. The founder of Great Commission International, Jim McCotter, is said to have usurped "the very authority of parents over these young people" by allowing youthful "elders" to exercise greater influence in the lives of the young adults than did their own parents.

Enroth's 1994 follow-up book, Recovering From Churches That Abuse, further mentioned McCotter when researcher Paul R. Martin noted that:

Some encouraging reforms have occurred in recent years after the founder, Jim McCotter, left the movement in the late 1980s. However... most ex-members that I have talked to are not fully satisfied with the reforms or apologies and feel that the issues of deep personal hurt and offense have not been adequately addressed.

Also in the book, Great Commission International (GCI) was criticized for not denouncing McCotter's teachings and negative influence on the movement, something GCI elder Dave Bovenmyer was quoted as saying "we cannot in good conscience do." A former member was quoted in response, suggesting such an attitude "protects unequivocally the prophet-leader (McCotter), keeping him in holy light, regardless of the realities of distortion and problems seen from those not under the spell. The implication is, then, that they, even though having made significant moves, are still under 'the spell.'"

== Publishing Pursuits ==
While with GCI, McCotter began several publishing enterprises, including a monthly publication called Today's Student, which claims to have reached circulation of 500,000 (a figure disputed by researcher Larry Pile in his book Marching To Zion.) His further interests in media continued with the acquisition of two radio networks (including Florida Radio News Network in 1988), and Media Net (a television holding company).

=== Sun Newspaper Group ===
In 1989, McCotter formed the Sun Newspaper Group and associated Sun Newspapers, which at their peak circulated 235,000 copies a week. After 15 months, McCotter unexpectedly fired the 96 employees and closed the newspaper. The Sun's content was described by Bill Bradford, formerly the Sun's managing editor, as "a very conservative viewpoint." Fred Fedler, chairman of the University of Central Florida journalism department, at one point criticized the Sun's content as "a bunch of fluff." McCotter was further criticized for his business practices as well as the sudden shutdown of the paper, which occurred without warning five days before the Christmas holiday of 1991. One former employee was quoted as saying, "I like Jim McCotter, and that sounds crazy, 'cause I also see him as devious and unethical and a money-grabber. And yet he's a very likable guy. You go figure it out."

=== Canterbury Television ===
In 2001 in New Zealand, McCotter bought Canterbury Television (CTV) for $500,000 and set up a newspaper called The Citizen. He further consolidated television interests there by buying out rival Now TV the following year. Following this, McCotter purchased an $800,000 luxury home with "spectacular ocean views" in Christchurch, New Zealand. The Citizen lasted about two years, before shutting down in July 2002. At least eight former employees sought legal advice over employment disputes with McCotter, and at least five of these cases were settled out of court. Sports editor Ken Nicholson publicly criticized McCotter's business practices following the closure of The Citizen, saying, "My first impression was that he was a slimy, greasy American and my impression since is that for all his supposed religious beliefs he has absolutely no caring for people at all. All it would seem McCotter is interested in is money and more money." McCotter was also criticized for damaging "the regional television product quite severely", having been accused of driving the three previous news programmes out of business prior to the closure of The Citizen. McCotter, an American, was also criticized as a "foreign investor" for not caring "about the interests of the locals."

== Political interests ==
McCotter also described himself through New Zealand Media Group as a "longtime member of the Council for National Policy", an umbrella organization and networking group for conservative activists. Pressed for his views about the CNP in an interview, McCotter replied "most in the Republican Party... would consider it an honor to have a leadership role in the CNP." Two of McCotter's nine children, Shannon and Liz, have also appeared on membership lists for the CNP.

== Maverick Jets ==
In March 2001 McCotter Aviation purchased majority shares of Maverick Air Inc., the brainchild of homebuilder Bob Bornhofen. He expanded Maverick Air Inc. under the name Maverick Jets and relocated it from Colorado to Melbourne, Florida.

=== Leader ===
In August 2002, McCotter was featured on the cover of the Brevard Technical Journal (a Florida Today publication) touting the Maverick Jets Leader, a Very Light Jet priced at $750,000 for "the common man." McCotter has experienced several setbacks in seeking certification and production for the Leader, the twinjet VLJ in which Maverick Jets chief pilot Jack Reed suffered a fatal crash in January 2003. On May 8, 2003 Maverick Jets laid off a significant portion of its staff suddenly and without warning. and McCotter's attempts to secure production with Tbilisi Aerospace Manufacturing in the Republic of Georgia fell through in January 2004, leaving McCotter with the task of finding yet another means of production.

=== SmartJet ===
Having produced very few Leaders, Maverick continued development of a next-generation VLJ, the SmartJet. Sohu reported that McCotter eventually signed a treaty with Xi'an, China Vice-Mayor Yang Guangsheng to begin production of SmartJets there. The treaty-signing ceremony was held on November 24, 2006.

In 2011, Lorenzo Amaya became the CEO of Maverick.

== Big Horn Mountain Resorts ==
McCotter purchased Powder Pass Ski Area, Meadowlark Lake Resort and Deerhave Lodge between 1998 and 1999, joining the properties under the operating name Big Horn Mountain Resorts. Andrew Purrier was a minority investor in the joint venture. A dispute broke out on December 23, 1999. McCotter insisted that the resort bar remain open despite Purrier's allegation of the moral toll it was taking on residents and workers. Subsequently, Purrier quit the business.

On April 9, 2007 McCotter was cited by the Wyoming Department of Environmental Quality for violating health, safety, environmental and sanitation conditions of his Forest Service permit because of raw sewage that had polluted Ten Sleep Creek. Bighorn National Forest Supervisor Bill Bass shut down Deerhaven and Meadowlark Lake Resorts because of the spillage. Frozen lines at both locations were suspected of causing the leaks. On May 15, 2007, Bass reported that McCotter, who had been restricted from touching the sewer systems during the closure, had submitted a plan to fix the problem, which was subject to approval by the U.S. Forest Service and the Wyoming DEQ. On July 19, 2008, the U.S. Forest Service permanently barring Jim McCotter from operating his businesses in the National Forest following a series of investigations and closures for alleged health and safety violations, pending a 45-day appeal period. On October 8, 2008, a pending sale of Big Horn Mountain Resorts was reported.

On June 30, 2009, the Washakie County Sheriff's department issued public notice of a Sheriff's sales of the entire Big Horn Mountain Resorts complex to satisfy unpaid creditors. The sale occurred on July 16, 2009 with the three properties making up the Big Horn Mountain Resorts selling for $410,000 to Wayne and Holli Jones, owners of another local lodge. A misdemeanor warrant for ignoring court orders to appear for allegation of failing to pay past employees was issued to McCotter by the Bighorn County attorney's office. Prior to the sale, the Washakie County Sheriff's Department set the minimum bid at $263,000 that included sale costs and outstanding liens filed against McCotter.
