= New Life =

New Life or A/The New Life may refer to:

== Religion and politics ==
- New life (Christianity)
- New Life Church (disambiguation)
  - New Life Church (Colorado Springs, Colorado)
  - New Life Churches, New Zealand, Australasian Pentecostal Church denomination
  - New Life Christian Fellowship, Evangelical church in Blacksburg, Virginia
  - New Life Ranch, non-denominational Christian summer camp in Oklahoma
- New Life phase of Meher Baba's spiritual life and teaching that begun in 1949
- New Life Movement, civic education program initiated by Chiang Kai-shek
- Operation New Life, care and processing of Vietnamese refugees in the closing days of the Vietnam War
- New Life (party), Nove Zhyttya, a political party in Ukraine

== Books and publications ==
- La Vita Nuova (The New Life), a book of verse by Dante Alighieri written around 1293
- A New Life (novel), a 1961 novel by Bernard Malamud
- The New Life (Pamuk novel), a 1995 novel by Orhan Pamuk
- The New Life (Crewe novel), 2023 LGBTQ historical novel
- New Life+: Young Again in Another World, a light novel series by MINE, with a manga adaptation by Satoru Abou
- Novaya Zhizn (Mensheviks) ("New Life"), the 1917–1918 newspaper of Mensheviks
- Novaya Zhizn ("New Life"), 1905-published newspaper of Bolsheviks

== Film and television ==
- A New Life (film), a 1988 American romantic comedy film starring, written and directed by Alan Alda
- New Life (2016 film), an American romantic drama film starring, written and produced by Erin Bethea
- New Life (2023 film), an American horror thriller film

=== TV and radio ===
- New Life Network, international distributor of family friendly television programs
- A New Life (Hong Kong TV series), a 1991 Hong Kong crime drama television series
- A New Life (Singaporean TV series), a 2005 Singaporean television drama series
- "A New Life" (JAG), a 1995 TV episode
- "A New Life" (The Outer Limits), a 2001 TV episode
- "New Life" (Agents of S.H.I.E.L.D.), a 2019 TV episode
- "New Life" (Taggart), a 2003 TV episode
- New Life 91.9, radio station in Charlotte, North Carolina

== Music ==
- The New Life, a psychedelic rock band who performed on the 1969 film The Sidehackers

=== Albums ===
- A New Life (album), a 1974 album by The Marshall Tucker Band
- New Life (The Thad Jones/Mel Lewis Orchestra album), 1976
- New Life (David Murray album), 1985
- New Life (Mehrzad Marashi album), 2010
- New Life (Monica album), 2012
- New Life (Antonio Sánchez album), 2013
- The New Life (album), the second album by Northern Irish band Girls Names 2013

=== Songs ===
- "New Life" (song), the second UK single by Depeche Mode 1981
- "A New Life", 1987 song by Pet Shop Boys
- "New Life", a song by Blind Melon from the Soup album
- "New Life", a song by MAX from the album Colour Vision
- "A New Life", song from the musical Jekyll & Hyde by Frank Wildhorn

== See also ==
- New Life Church (disambiguation)
