= Pentecostalism in Australia =

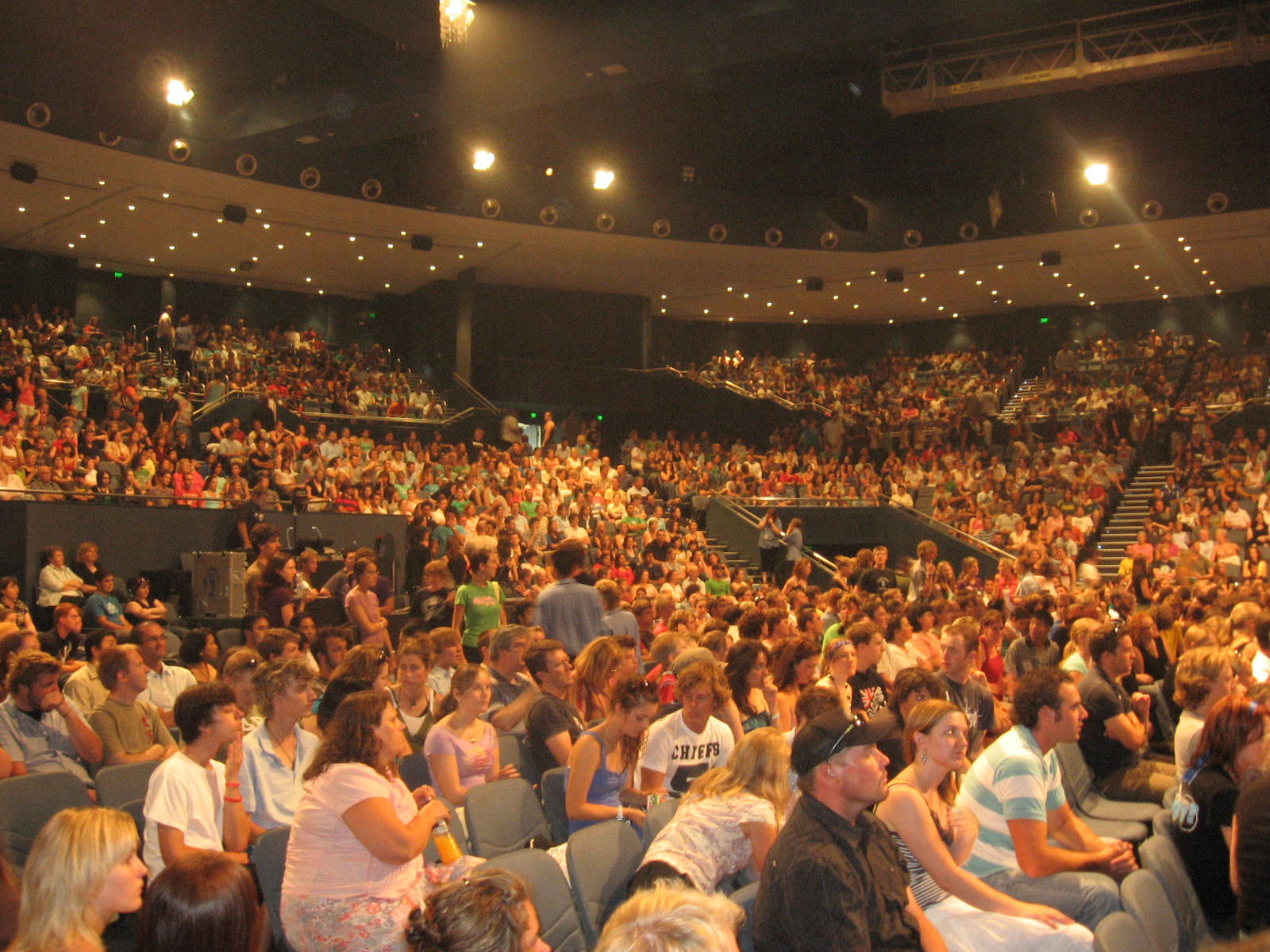
Inside Hillsong Church

Pentecostalism in Australia is a large and growing Christian movement. Pentecostalism is a renewal movement within Protestant Christianity that places special emphasis on a direct personal experience of God through baptism with the Holy Spirit. It emerged from 19th century precursors (such as the Holiness movement, the Higher Life movement, revivalism, the divine healing movement, and the like) between 1870 and 1910, taking denominational form from c. 1927. From the early 1930s, Pentecostal denominations multiplied, and there are now several dozen, the largest of which relate to one another through conferences and organisations such as the Australian Pentecostal Ministers Fellowship. The Australian Christian Churches, formerly known as the Australian Assemblies of God, is the oldest and longest lasting Pentecostal organisation in Australia. The AOG/ACC is also the largest Pentecostal organisation in Australia with over 300,000 members in 2018. Until 2018, Hillsong Church was one of 10 megachurches in Australia associated with the ACC that have at least 2,000 members weekly. According to the church, over 100,000 people attend services each week at the church or one of its 80 affiliated churches located worldwide (around 40,000 in Australia).

Scholars in recent years, such as Sam Hey, have noted the growth in Pentecostal membership accelerated in the 1970s with an increase in the "youth generation".

Australian Pentecostal denominationalism began in the early 20th century under the leadership of Sarah Jane Lancaster. Lancaster set up the first church called Good News Hall, and then merged with other burgeoning Pentecostal churches planted largely by her female helpers, under the name Apostolic Faith Mission of Australia (AFM). The AFM experienced conflict and debate over Christology, due to Lancaster's simplified interpretations of trinitarian theology, leading to the schismatic foundation of new denominations. In 1937, the Assemblies of God in Australia was formed from elements of the Apostolic Faith Mission, the Queensland Pentecostal churches which emerged from the 1924 Macknade revival (federated in 1929 as the Queensland Assemblies of God), and A.C. Valdez's Pentecostal Church of Australia.

The Assemblies of God became known as Australian Christian Churches in 2007.

== Early history ==
The creation of Australia as a prison colony for Great Britain caused the members of the colony early on to adapt to a non-class based system. The primary religion was Anglican, however the local people rejected Anglican authority on the grounds of their non-class based system. It was in this "free church" context that other religious traditions such as Catholicism and Methodism found adherents. The Catholic Apostolic Churches in Australia, which emerged under Edward Irving from a confluence of Scots revivalism and Spanish millennialism, maintained charismatic practice from 1853 through until the end of the 19th century, and significantly influenced the global healing movement. News of revivals happening worldwide reached Australia in the mid-19th century and similar stirrings began in Australia, particularly within Methodist circles of influence. Barry Chant identifies from 1870 a group of Methodist "Sounders", led by Joseph Marshall in rural Victoria, among whom glossolalic practice was directly connected via family links to the early Pentecostal movement. These trends contributed to a rise in the public practice of divine healing in similar areas, by people such as James Moore Hickson. It was with this backdrop that Sarah Jane Lancaster, the founder of the first Pentecostal church in Australia, practiced Methodism and began to learn about spiritual healing and related gifts of the Holy Spirit. She was introduced to Pentecostalism when she requested a pamphlet called Back to Pentecost from leadership in England. This pamphlet claimed that God had never revoked the gifts of the Holy Spirit, so she prayed for these gifts to come upon her. She was finally baptized in the Holy Spirit in 1908.

== Apostolic Faith Mission of Australia ==
In 1909 Sarah Jane Lancaster opened Good News Hall, the first Pentecostal church in Australia. After the opening of the church, Lancaster preached around the country to spread the message of Pentecostalism. Many accepted her message and created Pentecostal churches of their own, but did not formally unite under Lancaster's church until 1926 when a flamboyant itinerent evangelist Fredrick Van Eyck (also spelled Van Eyk) recommended utilising his South African denominational links under the name Apostolic Faith Mission of Australia (AFM). The AFM had problems from the start because the anti-doctrinal approach and the emphasis on personal interpretation led to disunity, although its final demise was due to Van Eyck's relationship with the daughter of a Queensland pastor, which incensed churches that had grown out of a holiness tradition.

== Reorganisation of denominations ==
In the same year, the Pentecostal Church of Australia was formed under the leadership of A.C. Valdez, an American convert from the Azusa Street Revival that had taken place in Los Angeles. With growing tensions within the AFM, some of the churches broke off and renamed themselves the Assemblies of God Queensland. In 1937, the Assemblies of God Queensland and the Pentecostal Church of Australia merged under the title Assemblies of God in Australia. Adopting the name "Australian Christian Churches" in 2007, this group has since been the largest Pentecostal denomination in Australia.

== Pentecostalism in Australia today ==
Though other denominations dominate Australia's population today (including from the top Catholicism, Anglicanism, Uniting Church and Presbyterian/Reformed), studies show that the number of proportional adherents of these traditions have all dropped. Conversely, the proportional number of adherents for Pentecostalism rose between the years 1991 and 2001. Adherence to Pentecostalism increased from nearly 220,000 in 2006 and 238,000 in 2011 to 260,500 in 2016. The average age of a Pentecostal congregation as of 2011 was 25.

In 2007, the Assemblies of God changed its name to "Australian Christian Churches", under the leadership of Brian Houston. to distance the contemporary Hillsong churches from older style Pentecostalism, and to increase participation. Until 2018, Hillsong, founded in 1983 by Brian and Bobbie Houston, was the largest church associated with the AOG/ACC in Australia. In 2007 the Hillsong megachurch claimed (within Australia) more than 40,000 members every week and had over 30 affiliated congregations in Sydney. Hillsong Church was one of 10 megachurches in Australia associated with the ACC that have at least 2,000 members weekly.

In September 2018 Hillsong withdrew from the ACC, and formed its own denomination. While much attention has been paid to Hillsong and to the ACC, two other significant Australian international Pentecostal networks centre on the C3 Global Network (founded by Phil Pringle and a number of others in 1980) and the International Network of Churches network (founded by Clark Taylor in what is now called Citipointe Church in Brisbane).

In 2018, Scott Morrison, who attends Horizon Church in Sutherland, became Australia's first Pentecostal prime minister.

== Fundamentalist and marginal pentecostalism ==
With its change of name the Australian Christian Churches moved to more conservative expressions of Pentecostal enthusiasm. In many churches, the dreams, vision and prophecies of the old Assemblies of God disappeared in the 21st century. There are, in Australia, however, examples of American/African/Latin American/Caribbean-style fundamentalist forms of Pentecostalism. Other marginal fundamentalist expressions of Pentecostalism include Logos Foundation, led by Howard Carter in Toowoomba, Queensland, and later in the same city, Breakthrough Centre Church.

== Notable members ==
- Scott Morrison, Prime Minister of Australia (2018–2022)
- Israel Folau, Australian professional rugby player
- Stuart Robert, Australian politician
- Margaret Court, Retired Tennis Player

== See also ==
- Australian Christian Churches
- Christian Life Centre
- International Network of Churches, formerly Christian Outreach Centre
- Evangelicalism
