= Force Ministries =

Force Ministries is a Christian-based organization targeting members of both the military and law enforcement. Its stated purpose is to impart faith in Christ, instill patterns and principles for victorious Christian duty and ignite individual calling and destiny.

== History and Links ==
Force Ministries, part of the Every Nation group, was incorporated on November 16, 2001, in Austin, TX as a subsidiary of Champions for Christ. Registered agents included Greg Ball, Jim Laffoon, and Greg Wark. Prior to becoming part of Every Nation, Champions for Christ was established in 1985 as part of the Maranatha Campus Ministries.

Current board members, according to Force Ministries website, include Greg Wark as president, along with Robert Owens and Art Smith.

== See also ==
- Champions for Christ
- Every Nation
- Maranatha Campus Ministries
