= UBF =

UBF may stand for:

- UBTF, a transcription factor in molecular biology
- Union for Future Benin
- University Bible Fellowship
