= Shepherding movement =

Movement within charismatic churches

The Shepherding movement (sometimes called the discipleship movement) was an influential and controversial movement within some British, Australian and American charismatic churches. The movement was also called the Christian Growth movement. It was set up by Christian leaders as a discipleship network. It was pioneered by five teachers: Charles Simpson, Bob Mumford, Derek Prince, Don Basham, and Ern Baxter, based in Christian Growth Ministries, Fort Lauderdale, Florida.

These leaders aimed to provide meaning and order through house churches and cell groups to address what they considered the lack of spiritual maturity of the Charismatic believers in the 1970s and early 1980s. The doctrine of the movement emphasized the "one another" passages of the New Testament, and the mentoring relationship described in the Second Epistle to Timothy. The leaders decided to mutually submit to one another and to hold each other accountable, and it was through the magazine New Wine that the teachings of the Shepherding Movement were emphasised and promoted: authority, submission, discipleship, commitment in covenant relationships, loyalty, pastoral care, and spiritual covering. Some feel that the motivation for launching the group was with the right intent, but that the Shepherding Movement quickly deteriorated into a cult-like environment in which people misused the teaching—intended to encourage maturity—into what was considered witchcraft by some. People could not make personal life decisions, including marriage, house moves, and career choices, without their shepherd’s permission.

== Early history and model ==
What began as a Charismatic Bible study that met weekly in Fort Lauderdale, Florida, the "Fort Lauderdale Five" (Don Basham, Bob Mumford, Derek Prince, Charles Simpson and Ern Baxter) evolved into The Holy Spirit Teaching Mission. This interdenominational group was incorporated in 1966 and expanded its scope with teaching conferences in Florida, later sponsoring conferences in other states. In 1969, it launched a magazine, New Wine, and, in 1972, changed its name to Christian Growth Ministries (CGM).

The Shepherding movement arose out of a concern for the weak commitment, shallow sense of community, and the general worldliness characteristic of many American churches. To solve these perceived issues, members in the house church were taught to have life-decisions “covered” by the house-group leader, elder, or pastor. Such decisions included where to live and work, whom to marry, or whether to see a doctor when someone was ill.

At the zenith of the movement, "They had a national network of followers who formed pyramids of sheep and shepherds. Down through the pyramid went the orders, it was alleged, while up the same pyramid went the tithes." The relationships that were formed became known theologically as "covenant relationships." A network of cell groups were formed. Members had to be submitted to a "shepherd", who in turn was submitted to the Five or their subordinates. "... large numbers of charismatic pastors began to be shepherded by the CGM leaders, a development that went uncharted but not unnoticed. It was uncharted because these relationships were personal and not institutional, so there were never any published lists of pastors and congregations being shepherded by CGM leaders ...."

Other movements influenced by the Shepherding doctrine were the Shiloh houses scattered across the U.S. (some of them transitioned into Calvary Chapels when they abandoned the shepherding movement ideas), International Churches of Christ, Maranatha Campus Ministries, the Jesus People USA (in or around 1991 were adopted by the Evangelical Covenant Church), and Great Commission International (today known as Great Commission Ministries/Great Commission Association of Churches).

== Pat Robertson's opposition ==
The Shepherding movement became controversial:

The heat of the controversy can be captured by reading an open letter, dated June 27, 1975, from Pat Robertson to Bob Mumford. Robertson said that in a recent visit to Louisville, Kentucky, he found cultish language like "submission" rather than churches, "shepherds" not pastors, and "relationships" but not Jesus. Robertson traveled to Oral Roberts University and found a twenty-year-old "shepherd" who drew tithes from fellow students as part of their submission. Robertson, drawing from Juan Carlos Ortiz's "Call to Discipleship", charged the leaders with placing personal revelations (rhema) on par with Scripture. He quoted a devotee as saying, "If God Almighty spoke to me, and I knew for a certainty that it was God speaking, and if my shepherd told me to do the opposite, I would obey my shepherd."

Figures within the charismatic movement (such as Pat Robertson) denounced the Shepherding movement:

Pat Robertson banned the CGM leaders and erased all tapes that included them. Robertson used Christian Broadcasting Network (CBN) to pronounce the shepherding teaching "witchcraft" and said the only difference between the discipleship group and Jonestown was "Kool-Aid." Kathryn Kuhlman refused to appear together with Bob Mumford at the 1975 Conference on the Holy Spirit in Jerusalem. Demos Shakarian, the founder and director of FGBMFI, declared the CGM leaders persona non grata. The number of voices swelled as criticism came from Dennis Bennett, Ken Sumrall, Thomas F. Zimmerman (General Superintendent of the Assemblies of God), and David duPlessis.

== Dispersal ==
The Fort Lauderdale Five eventually parted company. Derek Prince and Bob Mumford both publicly distanced themselves from the teachings. Derek Prince withdrew in 1983, stating his belief that "we were guilty of the Galatian error: having begun in the Spirit, we quickly degenerated into the flesh." Bob Mumford issued a "Formal Repentance Statement to the Body of Christ" in November 1989 and was quoted as saying, "I repent. I ask forgiveness." In the same article, Mumford also acknowledged abuses that had occurred because of his teaching on submission:

Mumford decided that he needed to publicly "repent" of his responsibility in setting up a system where so many people were hurt by misuses of authority. "Some families were split up and lives turned upside down," says Mumford. "Some of these families are still not back together."

This emphasis resulted in "perverse and unbiblical obedience" to leaders, Mumford said.

In his statement, Mumford admitted that he had not heeded earlier warnings about doctrinal error from Jack Hayford and two others. "While it was not my intent to be willful," he said, "I ignored their input to my own hurt and the injury of others."... He admitted that there had been an "unhealthy submission resulting in perverse and unbiblical obedience to human leaders." He took personal responsibility for these abuses, saying that many of them happened under his sphere of leadership.

== Australian controversy ==
The Shepherding movement within Australia was represented by the Logos Foundation under the leadership of Howard Carter. It came to a sudden end when Carter was found to have committed acts considered immoral in Christianity, although it did persist beyond the peak of the North American movement. Relocating from the Blue Mountains of NSW in 1987, its headquarters were in the Queensland city of Toowoomba, providing a conservative and sympathetic demographic. During this period Carter was living an extravagant lifestyle that frequently involved first class air travel to North American and other international locations, five-star hotels and many other luxuries. Carter drove a Mercedes Benz and lived in a large mansion with magnificent views from the Toowoomba escarpment. The Logos Foundation owned and operated with Australian staff a Bible College and motel in Canada. The financial affairs of the Logos Foundation were shrouded in secrecy from most followers, with little or no true accountability regarding the vast sums of money that were now involved.

Carter is arguably most infamous for the Logos Foundation's political campaign in the 1989 Queensland State election, in which he pushed the position that adherence to fundamentalist Christian doctrine was a more important consideration than opposition to the widespread corruption in the conservative Queensland government that had been exposed by the Fitzgerald Inquiry. The campaign was anti-homosexual, and at times the death penalty for homosexuals was advocated, in accordance with Old Testament Law. The Sydney Morning Herald later described part of this campaign when they published, "Homosexuality and censorship should determine your vote, the electorate was told; corruption was not the major concern." The same article quoted Carter from a letter he had written to supporters at the time, "The greenies, the gays and the greedy are marching. Now the Christians, the conservatives and the concerned must march also". These views were not new. An earlier article published in the Herald quoted a Logos spokesman in reference to the call for the death penalty for homosexuals, who stated "the fact a law is on the statutes is the best safeguard for society".

At the peak of his power towards the end of this period, Carter was virtually unquestioned in authority. The Sydney Morning Herald published an article in October 1990 which quoted several disillusioned followers, including the statement, "... we felt we had lost control over our lives. It was all dictated to us from above and that was very oppressive. Everything centered around Howard Carter; he had all the power".

Logos Foundation ceased to operate beginning in the early 1990s.

== Today ==
The degree to which the Shepherding movement still exists today is unclear. Some feel that while the intention of the movement was in itself not in error, later implementation became an unofficial source of unbiblical control and a form of clerical abuse that betrayed the original intent.

The term shepherding is still used today and is accepted as biblical teaching by many Christians. It should not be confused with the Shepherding Movement.

While both Charles Simpson and Bob Mumford have made public statements disavowing the movement, or at least distancing themselves from it, Simpson's biography the website of Charles Simpson Ministries highlights his co-founding of New Wine Magazine and specifically mentions Baxter, Mumford, and Prince as "notable Bible teachers" associated with the magazine.

The Shepherding movement ideologies live on today in some groups, most notably the group called University Bible Fellowship, which is currently active on over 70 US college campuses.

== Sources ==
- Moore, S.D.: "Shepherding Movement" in Stanley M. Burgess & Edouard van der Maas (eds), The New International Dictionary of Pentecostal and Charismatic Movements, revised edition, (Zondervan, 2003). Includes interviews with former adherants.
- Lambert, ThD, Steven: "Charismatic Captivation: Authoritarian Abuse & Psychological Enslavement In Neo-Pentecostal Churches", Second Edition, (Real Truth Publications, 2003); Chapter Two, pp. 21–41; "The Discipleship/Shepherding Movement" available online
- Burks, Ron and Vicki: Damaged Disciples: Casualties of Authoritarian Churches and the Shepherding Movement, Grand Rapids, MI 1992.
- "Remnant Church Denton Cult," Liberty Light Post, 2020.
