= NLCF =

NLCF can refer to:

- New Life Christian Fellowship, a church in Blacksburg, Virginia
- National Leadership Computing Facility
