= Rise Heart =

Live album by Victory Worship
- Released: October 20, 2015
- Recorded: July 21–23, 2015
- Genre: Contemporary worship music
- Length: 69:42
- Label: Every Nation Music

Victory Worship chronology
Radical Love (2014)	Rise Heart (2015)

Singles from Rise Heart
- 1. "Dance in Freedom"; 2. "Reign Forever"; 3. "My God"

Rise Heart is the second live album of Filipino worship band Victory Worship. It is the follow-up to its gold-selling debut release, "Radical Love".

== Radio singles ==
Three songs from "Rise Heart" were released to local Christian radio for airplay. The carrier single was "Dance in Freedom", written and sung by Yan Asuncion, who co-wrote Victory Worship's debut single, "Radical Love". The second single released to radio was "Reign Forever", sung by Cathy Go, lead vocalist on "Radical Love". The third and final single released to radio was "My God", sung by Joseph Ramos.

== Official music videos ==
Live performance videos were released on YouTube for six songs from "Rise Heart." In addition to videos for radio singles "Dance in Freedom" and "Reign Forever", videos were released for "Rise Heart", "Everlasting Glory", "Lay It Down", and "Lost Without You".

== Reception ==
"Rise Heart" was released on digital and CD formats on October 20, 2015. The Philippine Star music columnist Baby Gil wrote, "("Rise Heart") is just as well-made (as "Radical Love") and I do love the attention to detail that the producers also gave this album". On February 11, 2016, the Philippine Association of the Record Industry awarded "Rise Heart" a gold certification in recognition of sales of over 7,500 copies. This was the band's second consecutive gold certification.

== Track listing ==
Rise Heart
No.	Title	Writer(s)	Length
1.	"Call to Worship"		1:12
2.	"My God" (featuring Joseph Ramos)	PJ Corpuz	4:43
3.	"Lost Without You" (featuring Lee Brown)	Ntando Sithole-Clarke	5:13
4.	"Many Waters" (featuring Lee Brown)	Chris Davis, Robert Ellis Jr. and Jon Owens	4:19
5.	"Forever Be" (featuring Isa Fabregas)	Bryson Breakey, Elizabeth Broocks, Isa Fabregas and Rebecca Simmons	3:41
6.	"Ruler of Nations" (featuring Cathy Go)	Paul Barker, David Moore and Tamara Monk	5:36
7.	"Blessing & Honor" (featuring Lee Brown)	Elizabeth Broocks, James Murrell and Rebecca Simmons	6:50
8.	"Rise Heart" (featuring Isa Fabregas)	Isa Fabregas, James Murrell, Rachel Murrell and William Murrell	4:47
9.	"Pour Us Out" (featuring Cathy Go)	Justin Chapman, Kristin Hill, Shayne Hill and James Murrell	5:03
10.	"Call to the Nations" (featuring Lee Brown)		1:32
11.	"Many Waters (Reprise)" (featuring Lee Brown)	Chris Davis, Robert Ellis Jr. and Jon Owens	1:51
12.	"Everlasting Glory" (featuring Joseph Ramos)	Victor Asuncion	6:27
13.	"Praise to the Lord Almighty" (featuring Lee Brown and Cathy Go)	Jamie Kenny, Michael Mellet, Joachim Neander, Paul Mills and Catherine Winkworth	3:48
14.	"Reign Forever" (featuring Cathy Go)	Elle Cabiling, Chino Celeste, AJ Jiao, and Ian Tumaliuan	5:43
15.	"Lay It Down" (featuring Isa Fabregas)	Lauren Clemons and Jon Owens	3:50
16.	"Dance in Freedom" (featuring Victor Asuncion)	Victor Asuncion	5:07
Total length:			69:42

== Certifications ==
Country	Provider	Certification	Sales
Philippines	PARI	Gold	7,500+
