= Champions for Christ =

Established in 1985 as part of the controversial Maranatha Campus Ministries, Champions for Christ (CFC) is an outreach to college and professional athletes. Now a part of the Every Nation group of ministries, CFC has also come under the auspices of other organizations since initial establishment.

Champions for Christ has branches on 40 college campuses, organizing an annual conference for college athletes for the purpose of challenging young people to use their status and influence for the sake of the Gospel. In response to questioning by MinistryWatch.com over its targeting of athletes in particular, CFC responded "When we strategically draw and disciple athletes, we influence the culture and the world."

CFC believes that God has mandated them to reach and train the next generation, helping young men and women to grow spiritually and physically. As well as the annual conference, CFC conducts Champion All-Star Sports Camps. Several of these camps are conducted each year both in the United States and abroad.

== Controversy ==
While Champions for Christ has seen some success in recruiting big name athletes such as Chicago Bear Curtis Enis, Los Angeles Laker A.C. Green, Washington Redskins cornerback Darrell Green, and quarterback Mark Brunell, it has not been without controversy.

1998 saw CFC make national headlines when a number of NFL teams asked the security arm of the National Football League to investigate CFC over concerns that players were being taken advantage of financially. Champions for Christ was said to be steering NFL players to the group—Brunell's then-marketing representative, was accused of putting the fear of God into Chicago Bears running back Curtis Enis to get him to switch agents.

As well as media scrutiny CFC has also been questioned by watch groups, such as the National Values Center: "It's an entrepreneurial religious group. It's a new start-up business, quite frankly, What raises a question for me is when a religious organization uses Christianity as a front for making money. It makes me kind of queasy." Don Beck, National Values Center

== CFC Timeline ==
- 1985—Champions for Christ established as a ministry of Maranatha (was not separately incorporated)
- October, 1986—“Champions for Christ” is used in commerce for the first time, according to records filed with the US Patent and Trademark Office. “Champions for Christ” logo is registered as a trademark of Maranatha Christian Churches, Inc.
- November 28, 1990—The now defunct Maranatha Christian Churches, Inc. transfers the entire interest and goodwill of the Champions for Christ name and logo to Word of Life Church, Midland, TX (later renamed Mid Cities Christian Church). This is the church where Rice Broocks was then based.
- 1996 (n.d.)—Champions for Christ is an active University of Minnesota ministry operating out of the Minneapolis Maranatha Christian Fellowship church pastored by Bruce Harpel.
- November 22, 1996—Champions for Christ refiles the old Maranatha-owned CFC logo and the typed name, “Champions for Christ” with the US Patent and Trademark Office, claiming 10/1986 as the first use in commerce, thus claiming CFC's Maranatha history.
- 1998 - Darrell Green speaks as a Champions for Christ board member on the PBS program, Religion & Ethics.

== Links with other groups ==
- December 12, 1992—Executives for Christ, Inc. is incorporated in Texas as a subsidiary of Champions for Christ. Board members include Greg Ball and Ben Broocks.
- November 16, 2001—Force Ministries, Inc. is incorporated in Austin, TX as a subsidiary of Champions for Christ. Registered agents include Greg Ball, Jim Laffoon, and Greg Wark (pastor of the San Diego Morning Star church).
