= Radical Love (album) =

Live album by Victory Worship
- Released: September 12, 2014
- Genre: Contemporary worship music
- Length: 65:20
- Label: Every Nation Music

Victory Worship chronology
Radical Love (2014)	Rise Heart (2015)

Singles from Radical Love
- 1. "Radical Love"; 2. "Grace Changes Everything"; 3. "Jesus My Savior"

Radical Love is the first live album of the Filipino worship band Victory Worship. In February 2015, the album was certified gold by the Philippine Association of the Record Industry for sales of more than 7,500 units.

In June 2015, the song Radical Love was nominated at the 28th Awit Awards for Best Inspirational/Religious Recording.

== Radio singles ==
Three songs from Radical Love were released to local Christian radio for airplay. The carrier single was the title track, sung by Cathy Go. The second single released to radio was "Grace Changes Everything", sung by Lee Brown. The third and final radio single was "Jesus My Savior", sung by Isa Fabregas.

== Official music videos ==
Live performance videos were released on YouTube for the three radio singles from "Radical Love," namely "Grace Changes Everything", "Jesus My Savior", and the title track. A live performance video was also released for album opener "Faithful". Official lyric videos were also produced for all album tracks except "Shine Upon the Philippines".

== Reception ==
Radical Love was released on digital and CD formats on September 12, 2014. The Philippine Star music columnist, Baby Gil, wrote, "(Radical Love) is a very well-produced pop album of appealing songs that are great to listen to and which also gets you to worship the Lord at the same time." Radio Republic's Zach Lucero wrote, "...those songs we hear on radio are not quite expressed the same way as Radical Love."

== Track listing ==
Radical Love
No.	Title	Writer(s)	Length
1.	"Faithful"	Victor Asuncion, Arcyllin Arcilla, Myka Magsaysay and Mark Luna	4:25
2.	"Your Love Is Greater"	Charles Bautista, Lee Simon Brown and Chryssta Cordoves	5:54
3.	"He Who Loved"	Joey Benin, Barbie A. Honasan and Kelvin Lim	5:06
4.	"Lord of All"	Jose Villanueva III	5:38
5.	"Radical Love"	Victor Asuncion, Kit Estrella, Julius Fabregas and Mico del Mundo	5:58
6.	"Jesus My Savior"	Sarah Bulahan	6:48
7.	"Grace Changes Everything"	Neli Atiga, Jose Villanueva III and Fina Wowor	7:26
8.	"Hope Will Rise"	Jessica Chapman, Justin Chapman, Shayne Hill and James Murrell	5:41
9.	"Great God"	Archie Castillo and James Murrell	6:53
10.	"We Will Go"	Victor Asuncion, Robert Ellis, Juan Winans and Lisa Winans	6:04
11.	"Shine Upon the Philippines"	Joel Barrios	5:27
Total length:			65:20

== Awards and nominations ==
Year	Song	Award	Category	Result
2015	"Radical Love" (Written by Victor Asuncion, Kit Estrella, Julius Fabregas & Mico del Mundo)	28th Awit Awards	Best Inspirational/Religious Recording	Nominated

== Certifications ==
Country	Provider	Certification	Sales
Philippines	PARI	Gold	7,500+
