= Maranatha Campus Ministries =

Protestant-oriented Christian denomination in the United States

- Formation: 1971
- Type: Charismatic Movement
- Headquarters: Gainesville, Florida
- Location: International
- Official language: English
- Founder: Bob Weiner

Maranatha Campus Ministries was a Charismatic/Pentecostal-oriented Christian ministry founded by Bob Weiner which existed from 1971 to 1990. Its primary outreach was to college and university campuses.

== Beginnings ==
Maranatha began in 1971 in Paducah, Kentucky as a youth center led by Bob Weiner, a former Assemblies of God youth pastor. It was an outreach of a California-based ministry called "Global Missions." Weiner and his wife, Rose, had helped lead a large revival in Paducah earlier that year. Many disenfranchised "60's" teens found a new expression of Christianity in the center located near Paducah Tilghman High School. Large numbers of students from the surrounding area also began attending.

In 1972, Weiner founded a campus ministry called the "Maranatha House" at Murray State University, a few miles from Paducah. The word "Maranatha" means "Our Lord, come" or "Our Lord is come" in Aramaic, and was a popular Christian phrase around that time. Later in 1972, Weiner struck out on his own and changed Maranatha House's name to "Maranatha Christian Church." During the mid-1970s and early 1980s, other Maranatha chapters were established across the United States and Canada, as well as in Argentina, Brazil, Indonesia, France, Germany, the United Kingdom, Australia, New Zealand, and the Philippines. The ministry moved its headquarters from Paducah to Gainesville, Florida in 1979.

Weiner and his wife, Rose drew from a wide variety of leaders and influences all across the mainstream of the Charismatic movement including Kenneth Copeland and the Word of Faith movement, The Latter Rain Movement, Dennis Peacoke, Derek Prince, Ern Baxter and the Shepherding Movement, Paul Cain and the prophetic movement, Paul Jehle, Gary North, and other non-Charismatics who had Reconstructionist or Theonomic ideas.

Early members were discipled through weekly meetings and periodic weekend conferences which hosted top national speakers. Maranatha conference speakers included many of the big names in the Charismatic movement of the time, including ministers such as Oral Roberts and Larry Tomczak. A 1987 conference included Rosey Grier, Rich Wilkerson, and Larry Tomczak.

Maranatha's members were told to work hard, get the best grades, and look as good as possible in order to rise in the economic and political ladders of success to be next to influence decision-makers. The organization was one of the major players in the Christian right during the 1980s. It first got involved in anti-abortion activism in the 1970s, and this soon spread to other conservative causes. It also had an outreach to athletes, Champions for Christ. The group often referred to itself as "God's Green Berets."

Unlike most campus ministries, Maranatha functioned as a denomination. Its campus chapters were called "churches," and its leaders "pastors." At a local level, decisions were made by the pastors and elders of the university churches in their movement as well as by the traveling ministry teams.

In 1988 Maranatha established a church in South Africa at the University of the Witwatersrand in Johannesburg. This church changed its name to His People in about 1990.

== Criticism and controversy ==
=== Authoritarianism ===
Maranatha came under considerable fire during the 1970s and 1980s, largely due to its highly authoritarian structure. There were accusations of MCM being a cult with some former members reporting behavior similar to cults that frequently recruited college students during that time. As advocated by Derek Prince, members agreed to live in mutual accountability to protect their "purity in Christ." As was typical of most organizations influenced by Shepherding Movement teachings, this resulted in the organization developing clear authoritarian characteristics. Weiner, as Maranatha's president, was considered the ministry's "apostle," and was believed to receive direct revelations from God. Campus pastors supervised members' lives very closely. Disobeying one's pastor, or "shepherd," could have serious consequences ultimately leading to excommunication if one didn't fall in line with leadership. The movement was labeled as a "cult" or "cultlike" by some former members and newspapers.

=== Proscription against dating ===
Maranatha first came under fire because of its teachings against dating. Weiner considered Prince's book, God is a Matchmaker, to be a "revelation" stating that Christians should not date (though Prince's book does not directly advocate such an interpretation). He also claimed that sexual misconduct was rampant among college students. For this reason, members of Maranatha were barred from dating. Instead, singles were told to trust God, pray for God to guide them to a spouse, and hear God's voice speaking to them personally and individually about every decision. If a member believed God had spoken to him or her about marriage, he or she would pray with the pastor about whether that "word" was truly from God. Pastors would then send the names to Maranatha's regional offices for prayer, and sometimes Weiner himself would weigh in on some of these requests.

=== Tithing teachings ===
Another common criticism of the organization was its emphasis on tithing, or giving 10 percent of their earnings to the ministry. Although tithing is considered accepted practice in mainstream evangelical circles, several Maranatha pastors were rumored to keep detailed records of financial contributions. They reportedly admonished those who didn't give enough as having a "spirit of stinginess."

=== Criticism from universities ===
In 1982 the University of Waterloo in Canada expelled its Maranatha chapter after one member sexually maimed himself. After complaints from former members of the Kansas State University chapter, KSU expelled the MCM chapter in 1983. Among other things, Maranatha chapter members were charged with misleading university officials about who was to receive money from a fundraiser. One former member, Bob Tedford, said the pastor of the KSU Maranatha chapter said that lying to others was acceptable "only if it was for that person's own good."

Maranatha also came under fire from former members of chapters that didn't get expelled. Dennis Richardson, a former member of Maranatha's Penn State chapter, said he broke off his marriage engagement on the advice of his "shepherd." Kathy Mynatt, a former member of the University of Kentucky chapter, claimed that when she questioned a church teaching that tampons were unsafe, she was told she had a "spirit of independent thinking and rebellion" that needed to be cast out of her.

=== Christian Research Institute's report ===
During the ensuing outcry, Weiner volunteered to have the Christian Research Institute provide a letter of endorsement. He hoped to "expel the lie" that Maranatha was a cult. After a meeting between several cult-watchers and Maranatha's leadership, a six-member ad hoc committee was formed to address Maranatha's problems. More than a year later, the committee issued a scathing report criticizing Maranatha's theology and practices. Among other things, it found that Maranatha's authoritarianism had "potential negative consequences for members." It concluded:

Until we have clearer understanding of the changes which MCM claims are being implemented, and until we see more discernible evidence of change in the lives of people being impacted by MCM, we would not recommend this organization to anyone.

Committee members later said they would have used even harsher language in the report had they not feared legal reprisals. Weiner promised to address the committee's concerns, but later attacked it for anti-charismatic bias.

== Breakup ==
At a November 1989 meeting, after a few years of private conflict about the governance structure of the movement, Maranatha's board decided to disband the organization. The official explanation was that many leaders were uncomfortable with the group's denomination-like structure. However, another factor was intense criticism from the secular and Christian press, as well as former members and college administrators. This criticism had continued almost unabated since the CRI report, and grew especially pointed after The Chronicle of Higher Education published an article detailing concerns about abusive religious groups on college campuses. (See Criticism and controversy section.)

Many former Maranatha pastors have apologized and repented for the abuses of the organization, either personally or through books, and have asked for forgiveness. In the view of these pastors, dissolving the organization was necessary to allow for greater freedom in Christ. Indeed, at the last international conference held in San Antonio, Texas, in December 1989, Weiner publicly apologized and asked for forgiveness for any abuses anyone suffered from him personally from authoritarianism or from the organization. He also printed a public apology to the church at large in Charisma magazine in the winter of 1990.

In the break-up, leaders announced that the individual local churches were free to become independent entirely or to voluntarily associate with whomever they chose. Many of the local churches struggled with shrinking congregations and dwindling funds, merged with other churches, or closed. Most of the local churches that survived have different names now.

== Morning Star International/Every Nation ==
In 1994, several former Maranatha churches and ministries joined with other groups to form Morning Star International, under the leadership of former Maranatha pastors Rice Broocks, Phil Bonasso and Steve Murrell. Every Nation currently counts in its roster of churches at least seven former Maranatha churches in the United States, as well as a network of eight former Maranatha churches in the Philippines founded by Murrell.

Every Nation has publicly disavowed Maranatha's more extreme practices. It claims that Weiner and Maranatha practiced "controlling discipleship, authoritarian leadership, and theological mysticism," but that Every Nation itself "unequivocally rejects" such practices. In a May 2006 letter, Murrell stated that Every Nation does not permit any practices and teachings that were "controlling, coercive, or intrusive, or that violate biblical principles (or) the priesthood of the believer."

=== His People/Every Nation merge ===
In 2001, the His People network of churches in Europe and Africa merged with Every Nation. This network also has considerable past links to Maranatha. Its flagship church, His People Church in Johannesburg, South Africa was formed in 1992 after His People Campus Ministry at the University of the Witwatersrand united with Maranatha Church in Johannesburg led by Bill Bennot. As Vice President of His People International, Bennot maintained ties with former Maranatha ministers such as Rice Broocks. His People began cooperating with Every Nation in 1996, and unity talks around this time as well. The addition of His People to the EN stable greatly increased EN's footprint in Europe and Africa. Bennot is no longer affiliated with Every Nation.

== Responses to criticism ==
Morton Blackwell, former special assistant to President Reagan (who formed Students for America to lobby for President Reagan's policies on campuses) claimed that he hadn't seen anything in Maranatha's doctrine "outside the Christian tradition." Ralph Reed, later to become famous as the president of the Christian Coalition, said that he thought Maranatha got "a bum rap" from its critics.

== Notable members ==
Notable people to emerge from Maranatha include:

- Reggie White
- A.C. Green
- Debbye Turner, former Miss America
- Paul Wylie
- Terry Crews was briefly involved in the organization as a student at Western Michigan University, but left.

== Affiliated organizations ==
- Maranatha Campus Ministries, International
- Champions for Christ

== See also ==
- Every Nation
