= Sarah Jane Lancaster =

Australian Pentecostal leader

- Church: Good News Hall

Personal details
- Born: Sarah Jane Murrell, known as Jeannie; 1858 Williamstown, Victoria
- Died: 1939 (aged 80–81)
- Spouse: Alfred Lancaster (1879– )

Sarah Jane Lancaster (1858 – 1934) was the leader of Australia's first Pentecostal congregation. An evangelist and administrator, she established a printing press in her meeting hall to produce evangelistic tracts and pamphlets. Lancaster also published Australia's first Pentecostal magazine, Good News. Lancaster became president of the nation's earliest attempt to organise Pentecostalism into a denomination, the Apostolic Faith Mission of Australasia. Although she is recognised as the founder of Australian Pentecostalism and contributed to the unique prominence of women in the founding of Australian Pentecostal congregations, many of her doctrinal ideas were quickly abandoned as the movement developed.

== Early life and family ==
Lancaster was born in Williamstown, Victoria. She was the third child of Mary Anne Murrell and her husband, master mariner William Murrell. Lancaster was known as Jeannie within her family and signed her letters with that name.

In 1879 she married Alfred Lancaster, who sang in the York Street Methodist Mission that the couple attended. The Lancasters became street evangelists with Sarah Jane Lancaster the preacher. They had seven children.

Lancaster led the family's move away from the Methodist church in 1902 when she became disillusioned with the church's practice in relation to prayer for healing.

== Religious life ==
At the age of 44, Lancaster began an intensive personal study of scripture. As she looked for evidence that divine healing was intended as a continuing practice among Christians, she had a personal experience of what she regarded as supernatural healing of disfigurement of her arm. In 1904 she began to preach about divine healing, but her husband and family were no longer interested in participating in her ministry. Speaking in tongues was also unknown in Australian churches until Lancaster heard of the phenomena being practised in both England and in the Azusa Street revival that began in a storefront meeting in the US in 1906. She later heard that tongues had been experienced in Australia as early as 1880 at cottage meetings. In 1906 she received a pamphlet from England titled Back to Pentecost which discussed a spiritual baptism in the Holy Spirit still available to the church. For the next two years she experienced a deepening consecration as she prayed for the baptism of the spirit. Convinced that glossolalia – speaking in tongues – was intended as a permanent gift to the church, and not a brief manifestation in the apostolic era, she eventually began to speak in tongues. Spirit baptism evidenced by speaking in tongues became the defining Pentecostal experience of the 20th century. Accounts of her healing and spirit baptism were published in Good News magazine and were part of her testimony often repeated in her preaching and teaching.

In her accounts of her new doctrine, Lancaster described Pentecostalism as an extension of the revival fervour of early Methodism although in establishing in Australia there had been a clear decision by Methodists to distance its practice from the English dissenter flavour of 'chapel' worship, in order to maintain good relations with the Established Church. There were no women leaders in the Methodist church in Victoria at that time, although women's leadership had been significant in England from the inception of Methodism. Lancaster believed the equality of males and females in preaching, teaching, and church leadership was evident in scripture.

In 1908 Lancaster bought a shop-front at 104 Queensberry Street, North Melbourne, a former temperance hall, and began to gather a congregation. The building was known as the Good News Hall, and she lived there for the rest of her life. Her ministry began with all-night prayer meetings and attendance rapidly grew to the capacity of the hall which seated 300. As the founding editor of a monthly Pentecostal magazine, Good News, she reproduced material from international sources, including accounts of Pentecostal revivals in the US, prophetic interpretations of world events and testimonies of healing. In 1926 she aligned her congregation with the newly created Apostolic Faith Mission of Australasia (AFM). In 1930 she became president of the AFM, but it was already splintering over doctrinal quarrels, particularly about the role of women in the church, and it closed shortly after her death.

== Beliefs ==
Lancaster had many ideas that were dogmatic by conservative Christian standards. The emotional flavour of her Good News Hall provoked opposition from other church leaders and even the public, who sometimes greeted her street preachers with rotten fruit. She was not an assertive preacher, but she was a deep holiness bible teacher in the tradition of the Methodism of her youth. She also adopted the Wesleyan post-conversion 'crisis' understanding of the Christian life, by which the power of sin and assurance of salvation were established in the life of the believer through experiential works of grace. She described her two-year journey towards baptism in the holy spirit as a time of deepening consecration, leading up to an emotional 'Gethsemane' before she encountered the Holy Spirit experientially. Holiness was the focus of most Australian evangelicals at the fin de siecle, although definitions and practices of holiness were contested. The orthodoxy of her holiness preaching was part of her attraction to crowds of Christians seeking a deeper life-changing experience in an age of revivalism. She read widely and demonstrated her grasp of current affairs by applying political and economic problems to the much anticipated Parousia or Second Coming of Jesus. Her pre-millennial beliefs were also becoming mainstream in evangelical circles. She was also thought to embrace annihilationism.

Lancaster tried to avoid controversy by attempting to make theology understandable to the working-class people who made up her congregation. However, in her over-simplistic interpretations of Christology and Trinitarian theology, she began to teach that Jesus as the son of God was not equal to the Father and Holy Spirit. She taught 'the fourfold gospel': Jesus saves, Jesus heals, Jesus baptises in the Holy Spirit, and Jesus is coming again. In 1910 she began a preaching tour of Australia, demonstrating the power of the Holy Spirit by praying for the sick with the laying-on of hands, and encouraging believers to 'tarry' for the 'power from on high' which was the manifestation of glossolalia as described with an account of the coming of the Holy Spirit upon the apostles after the ascension of Christ in Acts 2.

== Controversy and opposition ==
South African evangelist Frederick Bernadas Van Eyk offered to collaborate with Lancaster and the Good News Hall from the time he arrived in Australia in 1926. By this time Lancaster had developed satellite churches and she had evangelists and teachers working throughout Australia. Van Eyk proposed that Lancaster align all of her work with his South African organisation the Apostolic Faith Mission. He was a much younger and stronger leader than Lancaster, who was now approaching 70. The Good News became the official publication for the AFM in Australia, a move that was made easy by the serendipitous inclusion of the words apostolic mission on the trust deeds for the church hall. In effect, Lancaster's fellowship of 20 churches became the first Pentecostal denomination in Australia, under Van Eyk's banner. An organisation known as the Pentecostal Churches of Australia was established about this time by a remnant of followers of the eccentric American evangelist John Alexander Dowie (25 May 1847 – 9 March 1907). Although Van Eyk initially travelled with his family, when his wife and four children returned to South Africa he formed what he claimed was a platonic friendship with a pastor's daughter. There were whisperings of sexual misconduct that offended churches founded in holiness teaching. A local newspaper in Queensland reported the scandal. In 1928 and 1928 the Queensland Advisory Council began to remonstrate with Van Eyk about his personal behaviour, without success, which led to the withdrawal of many congregations, while others split taking sides for and against Van Eyk. The AFM decided to remove his name from the organisation, but it was too late. Lancaster assumed the presidency of the AFM while the evangelist continued his own work independently. However, many churches were disillusioned both by the Van Eyk legacy and Lancaster whose name was forever linked with Van Eyk's scandal. The AFM began to decline as did the Good News Hall meetings. Her unorthodox teachings, including purported annihilationism, were raised in discussions among a group of churches that collaborated to launch what became the Assemblies of God in Australia. By 1937 the Assemblies of God held its first Australian conference with 180 delegates. Lancaster's daughter, Leila Buchanan, became editor of its official publication, The Evangel.

=== Decline of the ministry and death ===
Lancaster's first husband had died during the Van Eyk controversies, and she became depressed as her congregation dwindled. In 1931, the Good News Hall celebrated 21 years of ministry. Although Lancaster was feeling discouraged to the point of death, she rallied and remarried in June 1932, to Richard Hocking, whose motives were questioned by Lancaster's congregation. Lancaster believed the marriage would reduce her workload, but it brought controversy and opposition. Hocking soon wrote a lead article for the Good News magazine, but it was criticised for a lack of passion.

Lancaster died suddenly of diabetes mellitus on 6 March 1934.
