= New Life Church =

New Life Church may refer to:

- New Life church (Canada)
- New Life Churches, New Zealand
- New Life Church (Colorado Springs, Colorado), United States

== See also ==
- New Life Christian Fellowship, evangelical church in Blacksburg, Virginia
- New Life Ranch, non-denominational Christian summer camp in Oklahoma
