= Tom Short =

American traveling campus evangelist

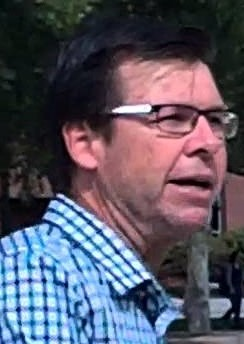
- Tom Short on a college campus
- Born: United States
- Occupations: Campus Evangelist
- Writing career
- Subject: Christian apologetics
- Website: www.tomthepreacher.com tomshort.net

Tom Short is an American traveling campus evangelist who lives in Columbus, Ohio.

== Career ==
=== Campus evangelism ===
Tom Short was ordained in 1977 by elders of The "Blitz" Movement at Solid Rock Church (now Linworth Road Church) in Columbus, Ohio. Missionaries of the movement at the time operated by filling buses with people, musical instruments and tracts in order to execute a 2- or 3-day campus blitz. They used singing, intensive tract distribution, and organized sidewalk canvassing to draw impromptu crowds and to achieve saturation of the intellectual marketplace. By 1980, Short began preaching on campuses while stationed at a church in College Park, Maryland, becoming a fixture outside the Hornbake Library on the University of Maryland campus.

In 2004, Tom Short spoke in a non-debate forum along with Jamal Badawi, a renowned Islamic scholar at Iowa State University. The two featured speakers presented their religions' view of Jesus and answered questions in the forum, co-sponsored by Islam on Campus and the local Great Commission Churches student group.

In 2007, Tom founded a Nonprofit organization called Tom Short Campus Ministries. Tom uses this ministry to fund his travel to college campuses where he open-air preaches. Tom usually preaches on public college campuses in the free speech areas and will speak with anyone who will listen.

Tom has an active Apple Inc. daily podcast along with active social media outlets he uses for his ministry.

In March 2012, the Iowa State Daily newspaper had an opinion article written about an upcoming campus visit titled: Perdios: DOs and DON’Ts of dealing with visiting preacher Tom Short. In the article, the author gives information about how Tom preaches, what to expect, and how to react to the visit.

=== Pastoral work ===
Short briefly served as pastor of Woodstock Community Church in Roswell, Georgia in 1990 while conducting services in the Roswell Holiday Inn, and then moved to San Diego to pastor MountainView Community Church.
