= Don Basham =

American minister (1926–1989)

Don Wilson Basham
- Born: 17 September 1926; Wichita Falls, Texas
- Occupation(s): International bible teacher, theologian, pastor

Don Wilson Basham (17 September 1926 – 27 March 1989) was a Bible teacher and author. Born and raised in Wichita Falls, Texas, Basham was raised in a Baptist home but later joined the Christian Church (Disciples of Christ) whilst at college. He became involved in the Charismatic renewal in 1963. Basham studied at Midwestern State University, Phillips University (BA) and its graduate seminary in Enid, Oklahoma (BD).

Following the reported miraculous healing of a close friend, Basham and his wife Alice experienced a spiritual awakening that led him to leave a career in commercial art in 1951 to enter the Christian ministry. He was ordained as a Disciples of Christ Minister in 1955.

== Family ==
Whilst at college, he met Alice Roling who was also born and raised in Wichita Falls. They married in 1949 and had five children; Cindi, Shari, Glenn, Lisa and Laura. Cindi, one of his daughters, married Dick Leggatt who later became the President of Derek Prince Ministries.

== Pastorates ==
After a five-year pastorate in suburban Washington, D.C., he became pastor of the Hillcrest Christian Church in Toronto, Ontario, Canada and later pastored East Side church in Sharon, Pennsylvania.

== Itinerant Ministry ==
After the publication of his first book, Basham left the pastorate in 1967 to commence a freelance writing and travelling ministry.

He travelled extensively in the US and abroad (Jamaica, England, Ireland, Germany, Italy, Austria, Yugoslavia, Hungary, Israel and New Zealand) teaching on subjects such as the Holy Spirit, deliverance, spiritual authority and faith.

Basham's deliverance ministry resulted in some notoriety. In the 1970s, Basham's and Prince's teaching on deliverance and practice of public exorcisms had a significant impact on the charismatic movement.

== Christian Growth Ministries ==
In 1970, Basham, along with Bible teachers Derek Prince, Bob Mumford, Ern Baxter and Charles Simpson, began teaching a controversial doctrine of 'spiritual covering' that required individual Christians to be submitted and accountable to a leader. They became the leaders of the Shepherding Movement. Basham submitted himself to Derek Prince as his personal shepherd.

Together with Prince and Mumford, Basham established Good News Church in Fort Lauderdale, Florida in 1974. Basham later relocated with the CGM to Mobile, Alabama in 1982 when it adopted the name Integrity Communications.

Basham was the editor of CGMs monthly magazine, New Wine from 1975 to 1981 and served as chief editorial consultant until it ceased publication in 1986. New Wine at one time was the most widely circulated Charismatic publication in the US.

== Books ==
Basham wrote sixteen books and numerous articles for Christian magazines.

- A Handbook on Holy Spirit Baptism
- A Handbook on Tongues, Interpretation and Prophecy
- A Manual for Spiritual Warfare
- Beyond Blessing to Obedience, CGM Publishing (1976)
- Can a Christian Have a Demon?
- Deliver Us from Evil
- Deliver Us from Temptation
- Face Up With a Miracle
- Lead Us Not into Temptation, Chosen Books (1986)
- How God Guides Us
- Spiritual Power: How to Get It, How to Give It
- True and False Prophets, Manna Books (1973)
- Miracle of Tongues
- The Most Dangerous Game
- The Way I See It
- Willing to Forgive

Co-author of:

- Family, Integrity Publications, (1982)
- The Unseen War, New Wine Publications (undated)
- Seed Truth, Manna Christian Outreach (1975)

== Related links ==
- New Wine Magazine archives
- Bob Mumford, Lifechangers
- Charles Simpson Ministries
- Derek Prince Ministries, International
- Good News Church
