= Victory (church) =

Evangelical multi-site church

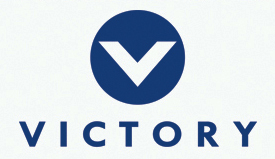
- Logo
- Abbreviation: VCF
- Classification: Christianity
- Theology: Evangelical
- Associations: Every Nation Churches
- Headquarters: 32nd Street corner University Parkway, Bonifacio Global City, Taguig, Philippines
- Founder: Rice Broocks; Al Manamtam; Steve and Deborah Murrell
- Origin: June 1984; 42 years ago Manila, Philippines
- Members: 80,000 (2015)
- Official website: victory.org.ph
- Slogan: Honor God. Make Disciples.

Victory Christian Fellowship of the Philippines, commonly known as Victory, is an evangelical multi-site church based in Taguig, Philippines. It is a member of Every Nation Churches.

== History ==
Every Nation Building in Bonifacio Global City, Taguig, which houses the Victory Church Central Office and Victory BGC Congregation

Victory Christian Fellowship of the Philippines was started by missionaries Steve and Deborah Murrell, who came to the Philippines in 1984 together with Every Nation Churches co-founder Rice Broocks and 65 other American university students on a one-month summer mission trip. Since 1984, Victory has grown until it presently has churches in 60 Philippine cities.

In 2015, Victory's Metro Manila church had 15 congregations, all with multiple services and locations, and many offering more than one language (English). The church has multiple locations and holds 94 services every weekend, each of them led by live preaching, training Filipinos to reach their cities, the nation, and the world. Over 10,000 leaders conduct small weekly discipleship groups. In 2015, Victory reported 80,000 members in Manila.

== Victory Worship ==
Victory Worship is the contemporary worship music band of Victory. In 2014, Victory Worship released its first live worship album, Radical Love. It and its 2015 follow-up, Rise Heart, were certified Gold by the Philippine Association of the Record Industry, Inc. (PARI). On March 25, 2017, the group released Awit ng Bayan, its first full Filipino-language single; and on June 1, 2017, the single Safe was released to radio and on digital formats.

== Beliefs ==
As a member church of Every Nation Churches, Victory adheres to the statement of faith of the Philippine Council of Evangelical Churches.

== See also ==
- List of the largest evangelical churches
- List of the largest evangelical church auditoriums
