= Evangelical Fellowship of Missions Agencies =

Christian organization

The Evangelical Fellowship of Missions Agencies was formed in 1946 as a result of the National Association of Evangelicals (NAE) recognition that there was not a sufficient amount of networking and communication between the missions arms of the NAE members. At its height, the EFMA covered over 100 agencies and almost 20,000 missionaries.

In 2012, the EFMA (renamed as "The Mission Exchange") was merged with Cross Global Link to form Missio Nexus. In 2023, Missio Nexus represented over 53,000 people involved in Christian work and the president was Ted Esler.

The EFMA Directors' papers are held at Wheaton College.
