= Derek Prince =

British evangelical missionary (1915 – 2003)

- Born: Peter Derek Vaughan Prince; 14 August 1915; Bangalore, Kingdom of Mysore, British India (now Bengaluru, Karnataka, India)
- Died: 24 September 2003 (aged 88); Jerusalem, Israel
- Education: King's College, Cambridge; University of Cambridge; The Hebrew University of Jerusalem; Eton College
- Occupations: International Bible teacher, theologian, Pentecostal pastor
- Website: derekprince.com

Peter Derek Vaughan Prince (14 August 1915 – 24 September 2003) was a Bible teacher whose daily radio programme, Derek Prince Legacy Radio, is broadcast around the world in various languages.

== Early years ==
Derek Prince was born in India to British parents and was a scholar of Greek and Latin, attending both Eton College and Cambridge University.

At university he described himself as an atheist, but while serving with the British army in World War II, he began studying the Bible and became a Christian.

== Marriage and the growth of his ministry ==
Prince married Danish missionary Lydia Christensen in 1946, becoming father to her eight adopted daughters before the couple adopted another daughter.

The family moved to the US in 1963 and pastored a church in Seattle. Prince worked at the Faith Tabernacle in Chicago, and then moved to Good News Church in Ft. Lauderdale, Florida.

In May 1971 Derek Prince Publications opened offices in Ft. Lauderdale, Florida. Derek Prince Publications became Derek Prince Ministries in December 1990.

Lydia died in 1975, and Prince married Ruth Baker (who had three adopted children) in 1978. They moved to Jerusalem in 1981.

The Princes traveled extensively in ministry until Ruth died on 29 December 1998. The following list of countries covers their ministry from 1993 to 1998. Some of these countries were visited more than once: Russia, Germany, Kazakhstan, Hungary, South Africa, Kenya, Indonesia, Malaysia, Singapore, Turkey, Poland, Bahrain, Cuba, Colombia, Switzerland, France, Portugal, India and England.

He is the author of 51 books, 600 audio and 100 video teachings, many of which have been translated and published in more than 60 languages. Some of the subjects that are covered in his teachings are prayer and fasting, foundations of the Christian faith, spiritual warfare, God's love and marriage and family. His daily radio is translated into Arabic, Chinese (Amoy, Cantonese, Mandarin, Shanghainese, Swatow), Croatian, German, Malagasy, Mongolian, Russian, Tamil, Samoan, Spanish, Bahasa Indonesia, Tongan, Telugu, Malayalam, Kannada, Hindi and many other languages. The radio program continues to reach many people around the world.

Derek Prince Ministries continued for the rest of his life to distribute his teachings and to train missionaries, church leaders, and congregations.

=== Demons and deliverance ===
As a Pentecostal, Prince believed in the reality of spiritual forces operating in the world, and of the power of demons to cause illness and psychological problems. While in Seattle, he was asked to perform an exorcism on a woman, and he came to believe that Christians could be "demonized" (normally described as "possessed" by demons – Prince avoided this term which implies ownership). This was at odds with the more usual Pentecostal view that demons could possess unbelievers, but could only oppress Christians. Prince believed that his deliverance ministry used the power of God to defeat demons.

=== Israel ===
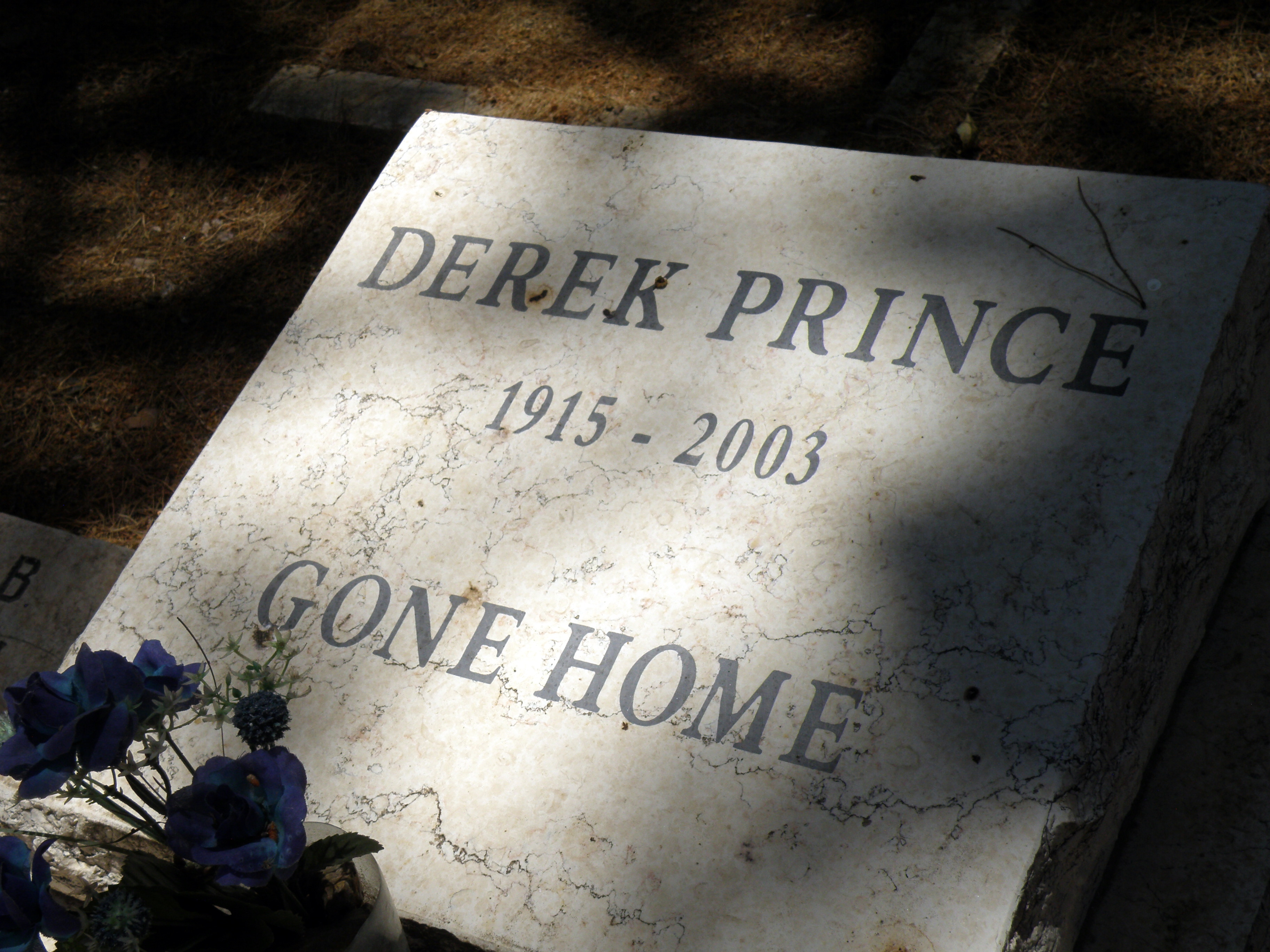
The grave of Derek Prince in Alliance Church International Cemetery, Jerusalem

Prince strongly opposed replacement theology. His book The Destiny of Israel and the Church argues that the Church has not replaced Israel and that the covenant that God made with the nation of Israel still stands today. Prince also believed that the creation of the state of Israel was the fulfillment of biblical prophecy. He states in his book Promised Land, "The central theme of biblical prophecy, as it is being unfolded in our time, revolves around the land and the people of Israel. God is carrying out His predetermined plan to regather the Jewish people from their worldwide dispersion and restore them to their ancient homeland."

== Shepherding movement ==
Prince created the Shepherding movement with fellow ministers Don Basham, Bob Mumford, Charles Simpson and Ern Baxter, who became known as the 'Fort Lauderdale Five.' They sought to counter what were seen as excesses within the Charismatic Movement, by emphasizing discipleship and pastoral care. The practice of 'personal submission to spiritual authorities' was considered controversial. Prince's association with the Shepherding movement provided international exposure. After leaving the movement, he focused on his own international ministry.

== Publications ==
Prince published many books and recorded more than 900 audio teachings and over 100 video sermons.

His books include:

- The Foundations Series (1966)
- Praying for the Government (1970)
- Shaping History Through Prayer and Fasting (1973)
- Appointment in Jerusalem (with Lydia Prince) (1975)
- Faith to Live By (1977)
- The Grace of Yielding (1977)
- Marriage Covenant (1978)
- Promised Land (1982)
- The Last Word on the Middle East (1982)
- God Is a Matchmaker (with Ruth Prince) (1986)
- Objective For Living. To Do God's Will (1986)
- Spiritual Warfare (1987)
- Blessing or Curse: You Can Choose (1990)
- The Destiny of Israel and the Church (1992)
- Does Your Tongue Need Healing? (1992)
- God's Remedy for Rejection (1993)
- Protection from Deception (1996)
- They Shall Expel Demons: What You Need to Know about Demons - Your Invisible Enemies (1998)
- Who is the Holy Spirit? (1999)
- Husbands and Fathers (2000)
- Judging: When? Why? How? (2001)
- Through the Psalms with Derek Prince (2002)
- Transformed for Life: How to Know God Better and Love Him More (2002)
- War in Heaven: God's Epic Battle with Evil (2003)
- Rules of Engagement: Preparing for Your Role in the Spiritual Battle (2006)
- Entering the Presence of God: Moving Beyond Praise and Thanksgiving to True Worship (2006)
- Bought with Blood (2007, previously published in 2000 under the title Atonement, Your Appointment with God)
- Prophetic Guide to the End Times (2008)
- Secrets of a Prayer Warrior (2009)
- Lucifer Exposed: The Devil's Plans to Destroy Your Life (2016)
- “The Beast or The Lamb” (2022)

== Death ==
Derek Prince died of natural causes on 24 September 2003, at the age of 88. He had suffered a prolonged period of declining health and died in his sleep at his home in Jerusalem.

== Bibliography ==
- Stephen Mansfield, Derek Prince: A Biography (Charisma House, 2005).
- Obituary in King's College Cambridge Annual Report, 2004.

== See also ==
- Christian Zionism in the United Kingdom
