= Paul R. Martin =

American psychologist (1946–2009)

- Born: June 28, 1946; Nebraska, US
- Died: August 12, 2009 (aged 63)
- Occupations: Psychotherapist, Psychologist, Author, Pastor, Director, Wellspring Retreat

Paul R. Martin (1946–2009) was a psychotherapist, licensed clinical psychologist, author, pastor, and director of the Wellspring Retreat and Resource Center in Ohio. He also worked in private practice in Athens, Ohio. Martin taught psychology, psychopharmacology, and the Biblical basis of behavior for five years at Geneva College, where he was a member of the department of psychology.

In his 1994 book Cult-Proofing Your Kids, Martin wrote about his former membership and leadership in the Great Commission International (currently called Great Commission Association of Churches). In 1971, he dropped out of graduate school to join the group, when it was known as "The Blitz". He later explained that he left the group when he did not receive an adequate response, after questioning its more controversial methods and tactics.

== Career ==
Martin served as an expert witness in court cases including the Lee Boyd Malvo sniper trial and the trial of Zacarias Moussaoui. Having neither interviewed the defendants nor studied their cases, Martin nonetheless testified in general terms about the mindset of people who have been "indoctrinated".

== Published works ==
=== Books ===
- Martin, Paul R. (1 April 1993). Cult proofing your kids. Grand Rapids, Mich.: Zondervan Pub. House. ISBN 978-0310537618.
- Martin, Paul R., ed. (31 March 1991). Handbook of behavior therapy and psychological science: an integrative approach. New York: Pergamon Press. ISBN 978-0080361291.

=== Articles and Book chapters ===
- West, Louis J.; Martin, Paul R. (5 August 1994). Lynn, Steven Jay; Rhue, Judith W. (eds.). Dissociation: clinical and theoretical perspectives. New York: Guilford Press. pp. 268–288. ISBN 978-0898621860.
- "Post-cult Recovery: Assessment and Rehabilitation". (1993). Langone, Michael D. (ed.). Recovery from Cults: Help for Victims of Psychological and Spiritual Abuse. New York: W.W. Norton. ISBN 9780393701647.
