= University Bible Fellowship =

Evangelical Christian organisation

- Formation: 1961; 65 years ago
- Founders: Samuel Chang-Woo Lee; Sarah Barry
- Founded at: South Korea
- Type: 501(c) organization
- Legal status: Active
- Headquarters: Chicago, Illinois
- Website: ubf.org

The University Bible Fellowship (UBF; Korean: 대학생성경읽기선교회) is an international evangelical non-denominational Christian entity that originated in South Korea in 1961. It was founded through a partnership between a Korean, Samuel Chang-Woo Lee, and Sarah Barry, an American Presbyterian missionary who was sent to South Korea. The international headquarters of UBF is in Chicago. The group members are concentrated in South Korea, but has chapters in 91 countries including American universities and community colleges. The organization's stated goal is student evangelism.

== History ==
UBF began in South Korea as a student movement built around one-on-one teaching sessions for college students using the Bible and instilling the founders' version of Shepherding Movement teachings. In 1964, UBF began expanding its campus presence through missionary work in South Korea. In 1966, the group established their headquarters in Seoul. In the 1970s, UBF began expanding to North America and is mentioned in the group of campus ministries who actively engaged in student recruitment to create Bible-based societies. In 1975, the organization became incorporated as a non-profit organization in the United States, in the state of Mississippi. Soon after the incorporation, the organization's international headquarters was relocated from Seoul to Chicago. They continued to establish chapters on college campuses in Africa, Europe, South America, Asia, Oceania, and North America. In 2020, Wheaton College (Illinois) partnered with the Chicago chapter of the group to provide a cross-cultural ministry certification.

== Reactions ==
Reactions to the group's recruitment efforts on college campuses have been mixed. Some regard the group as a self-supporting missionary model. Others have, at times, limited or banned the group from practicing their on-campus recruiting efforts, such as at University of Winnipeg (1989), University of Manitoba (1991), and University of Illinois (1993) The group has been documented by various religious watchdog organizations, such as the New England Institute of Religious Research, the Freedom of Mind Resource Center, and the Evangelical Center for World Survey. Some consider the group to be a hyper-evangelical Christian movement contributing to the restoration of Christianity in the United States and other countries. Other observers and former members describe the group as cult-like, excessively controlling, spiritually damaging, or abusive.

== Financials ==
In the United States, the group is registered as a non-profit organization and registered with the Evangelical Council for Financial Accountability (ECFA). According to the ECFA, the group reported $2,149,367 of total revenue and $2,073,393 of total expenses for 2019. The group had $13,907,906 in net assets as of the end of 2019.
