= Interdenominational Foreign Mission Association =

Christian organization

The IFMA was founded in 1917 with the mission of strengthening Christian Mission agencies by upholding standards of operation, assuring integrity and cooperative resourcing to spread the gospel. The association was created to be a fellowship of missions without denominational affiliation and by 1965, there were 46 different groups attached to the IMFA.

The organization later became known as CrossGlobalLink and in 2012 it merged with The Mission Exchange to form Missio Nexus.
