= Logos Foundation (Australia) =

The Logos Foundation was an influential and controversial Christian ministry that flourished in Australia in the 1970s and 1980s under the leadership of Howard Carter, originally a Baptist pastor from Auckland, New Zealand. Logos Foundation was initially a trans-denominational charismatic teaching ministry, primarily Protestant but with some ties to Catholic lay groups and individuals.

In 1987, the foundation moved to Toowoomba, Queensland, where there were already associated fellowships and a demographic environment highly conducive to the growth of extreme right-wing religio-political movements. This fertile ground saw the movement peak in a short time, reaching a local support base of upwards of 2,000 people, supplemented by a large mail-order support base.

In 1989 Logos controversially involved itself in the Queensland State election, running a campaign of surveys and full-page newspaper advertisements promoting the line that candidates' adherence to Christian principles and biblical ethics was more important than the widespread corruption in the Queensland government that had been revealed by the Fitzgerald Inquiry. Published advertisements in the Courier-Mail at the time promoted strongly conservative positions in opposition to pornography, homosexuality and abortion, and a return to the death penalty. Some supporters controversially advocated Old Testament laws and penalties. This action backfired sensationally, with many mainstream Churches, community leaders and religious organisations distancing themselves from the Logos Foundation after making public statements denouncing them. At times the death penalty for homosexuals was advocated, in accordance with Old Testament Law. The Sydney Morning Herald later described part of this campaign when they published, "Homosexuality and censorship should determine your vote, the electorate was told; corruption was not the major concern." The same article quoted Carter from a letter he had written to supporters at the time, "The greenies, the gays and the greedy are marching. Now the Christians, the conservatives and the concerned must march also". These views were not new. An earlier article published in the Herald quoted a Logos spokesman in reference to the call for the death penalty for homosexuals in order to rid Queensland of such people, who stated "the fact a law is on the statutes is the best safeguard for society".
