= Wellspring Retreat and Resource Center =

- Company type: nonprofit 501(c)(3) corporation in the United States.
- Industry: residential counseling center
- Genre: Psychology
- Founded: 1986
- Founder: Paul R. Martin
- Headquarters: Albany, Ohio, United States
- Key people: Paul R. Martin, CEO
- Services: treatment of individuals exposed to abusive religious groups, organizations, and cults
- Website: wellspringretreat.org

Wellspring Retreat and Resource Center is a Christian countercult movement-affiliated residential counseling center claiming to specialize in the treatment of individuals who they evaluate as "having been abused in relationships, cults, situations of trauma, and by destructive therapeutic alliances resulting in emotional betrayal and/or physical harm". It was founded in 1986 by Paul R. Martin and his wife Barbara, and is located in Albany, Ohio.

== History ==
It was founded in 1986 by psychologist Paul R. Martin and his wife Barbara, it is located in Albany, Ohio. Martin.

== Services ==
Wellspring claims that it has treated more than 500 former cult members from the United States and nine foreign countries since the retreat opened in 1986. All of the staff are Christian and "former members of cults", and their staff have included cult researchers and counselors, one being researcher Larry Pile.

It also offers educational, consulting, and family support services. Several of its staff members are published authors, and Wellspring is also an informational resource to national and international media to raise awareness about coercive persuasion and its treatment.

Wellspring has been praised by Christian countercultist Dr. Ronald Enroth, in his best-selling book Churches That Abuse, as well as in the follow-up book, Recovering From Churches That Abuse. In the latter he wrote, in part:

Wellspring exists because recovering emotionally, restoring a loving relationship with God, and re-entering society are not easily accomplished on one's own. The accounts in this book reveal how tortuous the path to recovery can be without professional, caring help. The tragedy is that for the victims of spiritual abuse, the options are disappointingly few. Not many programs are especially equipped, as Wellspring is, to treat victims of spiritual abuse.

== Criticism ==
Jeffrey Hadden said former Wellspring clients have told him the retreat uses some of the very thought reform techniques it attributes to cults.
