= New Life Christian Fellowship =

Coordinates: 37.2300°N 80.4156°W

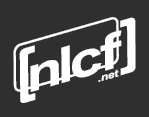
- NLCF official website logo
- Formation: 1989
- Location: Blacksburg, Virginia
- Members: 200
- Pastors: Steve Englund, Robbie Poff, Jeanette Staats, Kristal Poff
- Affiliations: Ecclesia Network Collegiate Church Network
- Staff: 9
- Website: nlcf.net

New Life Christian Fellowship (NLCF) is an evangelical Christian church in Blacksburg, Virginia that ministers to the Virginia Tech and New River Valley communities. An estimated 200 worshipers attend one of the church's three weekly gatherings, most of whom are college students attending services on the Virginia Tech campus.

== Beliefs and practices ==
Regarding the Apostles' Creed and the Nicene Creed, members of NLCF "stand together with Christians everywhere across the centuries that have embraced these basic statements of faith. These creeds form the core expression of our faith." The tripartite mission of NLCF is to:

1. invest in spiritual growth,
2. invite others to follow Jesus, and
3. inspire each other to change the world.

Although NLCF's weekly services draw large crowds, much of the church life takes place in small groups. Members meet on Tuesdays, Wednesdays, or Thursdays in "homegroups" that attract between 20 and 40 in the same age bracket. Smaller "lifegroups" with 5 to 10 members, typically all male or all female, also meet for more weighty spiritual discussions, Bible study, and prayer.

Because the majority of NLCF's members are college students, the church's staff members must raise support for their own salary. This process typically lasts at least nine months after training.

== History ==
JR Woodward founded in church in 1989 as a part of Great Commission Ministries, a quasi-denominational organization. NLCF leaders have cited the church's "sending capacity" as being more important than its "seating capacity." In 2003, Woodward and other members of NLCF planted a church in Los Angeles named Kairos Los Angeles, and in 2008, NLCF partnered with a church in Maryland to establish another seed church in Richmond, Virginia.

Closer to home, the church branched off into two congregations in 2007: a "downtown" congregation that serves non-student New River Valley residents and a Virginia Tech congregation that caters to the younger student population. NLCF also purchased the old Red Cross building in Blacksburg to increase its visibility in the local community, although renovations have delayed the new site's opening.

=== Virginia Tech shooting ===
Following the Virginia Tech shootings in 2007, NLCF received widespread media coverage. Christianity Today reported that two NLCF members died in the shootings and ten others were somehow connected to the church in a feature article on the church. NLCF pastor Jim Pace was a guest on Larry King Live and Good Morning America, and CNN created a video of the church's memorial service. Several other newspapers, magazines, and radio shows carried quotes from NLCF pastors.

On the night of the shooting, Pace told a national audience on Larry King Live that the church was

just trying to focus on giving some people a variety of different ways they can deal with this. We have some larger group things for people that want to process this with lots of people. And then we've got some smaller things for people that want to hole up in their -- in their dorm or in their apartment and just kind of try to sort this out with a few friends. We're just trying to be as many places as we can. We're helping out with what the university is doing, as well, and just trying to lend our support there.

In response, Dr. Phil McGraw applauded Jim Pace's comments and efforts on Larry King Live, saying, "God bless Pastor Pace for being on site and stepping up and providing a place for people to go to share their thoughts, share their feelings."

The morning after the shooting, Pace responded to a request on Good Morning America for a single comforting sentence by saying that "any sentence would probably just sound fairly trite." He also pointed to free will as part of the cause of the incident and encouraged people to draw closer to God.

The Washington Post reported that Pace said, "We learned evil is real and evil can hurt us, but God's love is real." Matt Rogers, another NLCF pastor, was interviewed on NPR's Morning Edition, encouraging people to "overcome evil with good".
