= Every Nation Churches & Ministries =

Christian denomination

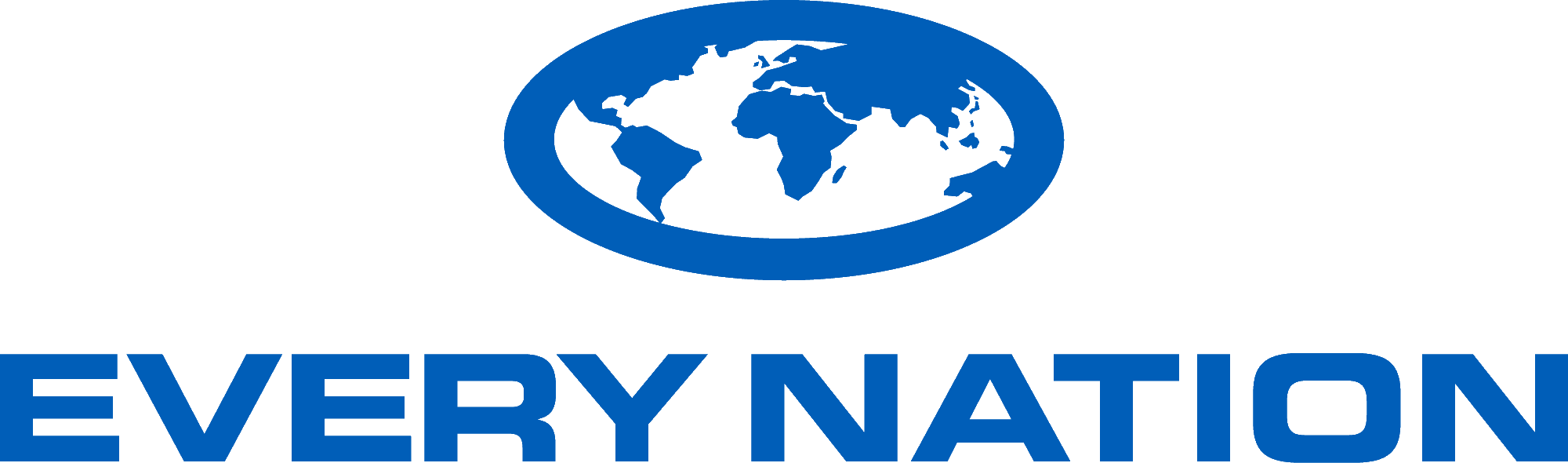
- Formation: 1994
- Founder: Phil Bonasso, Steve Murrell, Rice Broocks
- Region served: Africa, Asia, Europe, Middle East, North America, Latin America, Oceania
- President: Steve Murrell
- Website: everynation.org
- Formerly called: Morning Star International

The Every Nation Building in the Philippines completed its first phase in 2003, while the second phase was completed in 2015. It also serves as the central office of Victory Christian Fellowship, one of Every Nation's founding members.

Every Nation Churches & Ministries is a worldwide organization of churches and campus ministries. The organization is located in seven regions around the world. The president is Steve Murrell.

== History ==
In 1994, American evangelists Phil Bonasso and Rice Broocks visited Victory Christian Fellowship of the Philippines, Inc. led by Steve Murrell in Manila, Philippines. Together, they founded Morning Star International before changing the name in 2004 to Every Nation. As of 2026, Every Nation has churches in 86 nations. It is notable that Broocks had a prominent role in Maranatha Campus Ministries before it folded in 1990.

== Publications ==
100 Years From Now by the president and co-founder, Steve Murrell, states: "100 Years From Now explores the importance of understanding mission, values, and culture in order to grow and sustain a movement." The book details the multigenerational focus of the movement, with leaders desiring to pass on its vision by building its future through developing young leaders on campuses and within the Every Nation movement. Joey Bonifacio, an Every Nation pastor published The Lego Principle, which was cited by LifeWay Research president Ed Stetzer in an Outreach Magazine article examining successful practices for churches that prioritize membership growth not only in numbers, but in personal — or spiritual — development. Bonifacio’s The Lego Principle argues the importance of discipleship based on the two greatest commandments according to Jesus Christ, to “love God” and “love your neighbor.”

According to its profile on the ECFA site, Every Nation Churches & Ministries' 2009 revenue was $3,358,141 and total expenses were $3,097,551.

== Media ==
The movie God's Not Dead was inspired by Rice Broocks' God's Not Dead book. Though it received poor critic reviews and was produced on a small budget, it still managed to more than triple in profit. The next movie, God's Not Dead 2, leads from Rice Broocks' Man, Myth, Messiah. Rice Broocks is said to have written portions of the script and appears in the movie along with his Man Myth Messiah book.
