= Ern Baxter =

Canadian Pentecostal evangelist (1914–1993)

- Born: William John Ernest Baxter; 1914; Saskatchewan, Canada
- Died: 1993 (aged 78–79); San Diego, California
- Citizenship: United States

William John Ernest (Ern) Baxter (1914–1993) was a Canadian Pentecostal evangelist.

== Early life ==
Born in Saskatchewan, Canada, he was baptised into a Presbyterian family. His mother was involved with a holiness church and following his father’s conversion they went into classical Pentecostalism. Their city was visited by a Scandinavian itinerant minister with a "signs and wonders" approach to Christianity. While in the Baxter’s home city, he taught on the baptism in the Holy Spirit. Ern Baxter’s mother was the first in those meetings to receive the "baptism of power." Baxter recalled seeing his father help her into the house drunk in the Spirit. Later in his teenage years, Baxter went through a period where he lost his faith in reaction to the legalism of religion and became seriously ill from pneumonia. Two events brought him back to Christianity – a miracle of healing and the words of a friend: "Ern, being a Christian isn’t about what you do for God, it’s about what God in Christ Jesus has done and will continue to do for you".

== Ministry ==
On 24 May 1932, he entered full-time ministry as a musician travelling across Canada with a missionary. While travelling, Baxter and his companion came to a conference held in Trossachs in Canada. There Ern Baxter received the baptism in the Holy Spirit. Trossachs was an unusual conference as the delegates were not Pentecostal in the classic sense – they were seeking the experience of the Holy Spirit. This was Ern’s first exposure to what was to become a central passion in his life and ministry – Word and Spirit or Reformed doctrine and charismatic life and power. The morning after he had been baptised in the Holy Spirit, he said God spoke to him and called him to the ministry saying, "I want you to preach My Word".

In 1947, Baxter attended a service in Winnipeg where William Branham was speaking. Branham later spoke in Vancouver at meetings that were led by Baxter. Subsequent to the meetings, Branham approached Baxter and told him that he had been praying and the angel of the Lord had spoken to him and told him to invite Ern Baxter to become his companion in ministry. Baxter left Branham sometime in 1953 or 1954, primarily because Branham was starting to preach things that Baxter felt were "seriously wrong".

Ern Baxter had a major influence not just in the United States but also across the world, particularly in Australia and the United Kingdom. He came to the United Kingdom in 1975 and preached keynote addresses at the main charismatic conferences – the Lakes and Dales Bible Weeks. Professor Andrew Walker wrote of "the powerful influence of an American, Ern Baxter" because of his influence on the British New Church Movement. The Bible Weeks were run by UK charismatic leader Bryn Jones and his team of churches. Andrew Walker wrote, "Baxter’s influence was sensational; the audiences went wild every time he appeared ... during the first Bible Week at the Great Yorkshire Showground in 1976, Baxter was the great attraction and as in the previous year excitement was at fever pitch".

Baxter’s ministry did not just affect Bryn Jones’ churches. Terry Virgo, the father of the Newfrontiers family of churches wrote, "Ern Baxter was a powerful prophetic preacher, able to paint a huge picture of the magnificent end-time church. He was deeply rooted theologically, very widely read but also profoundly steeped in a powerful Pentecostal background ... the influence of Ern Baxter and his friends was growing even greater in the USA and their monthly magazine New Wine became their radical trumpet voice was now being read all around the world".

Baxter did not limit himself to being a conference speaker. He believed in the principles of discipleship and took on 12 pastors to mentor and support where he could. Each of these men would travel over to meet him in his home, firstly in Mobile, Alabama, and then in San Diego, California, to spend time hearing him teach. He travelled as much as his health would allow, supporting and visiting his "sons" and their churches. He did not only teach from his experience but from a massive library of 9,000 plus books and journals that are now housed in a Memorial Library in Mobile, Alabama under the auspices of Charles Simpson Ministries.

By the end of his life, Baxter was taking an interest in imparting all that he had learned to younger men – his "Timothys". "Ern has a profound preaching and teaching ministry. He is a preacher’s preacher. It is important that the taped and printed records of his ministry be preserved and propagated".

Baxter is possibly best known for being part of what was called the Shepherding Movement, an influential and controversial expression of the charismatic renewal in the 1970s and 1980s. Its emphasis on submission to a personal pastor, or "shepherd" as the movement termed it, brought accusations of authoritarianism.
