= Amaleki (Book of Mormon explorer) =

According to the Book of Mormon, Amaleki (/əˈmæləkaɪ/) was a Nephite explorer who lived in the Americas in the 2nd century BC. He is mentioned briefly as one of the brothers of Ammon, and one of sixteen men that were part of Ammon's band. Under the direction of king Mosiah, the band embarked upon a quest from the land of Zarahemla to find the group of Nephites that had left years before to settle in the land of Nephi (which was predominantly populated by Lamanites at the time). Their exploration party wandered in the wilderness for 40 days before finally stumbling upon the people of Zeniff, who mistook them for Lamanite spies and threw them in prison. Ammon's band was eventually released and helped the people of Zeniff escape the occupation of the Lamanites and return to Zarahemla.

== Etymology ==
According to Hugh Nibley, the name Amaleki simply means "my king."
