= Ammon (Book of Mormon explorer) =

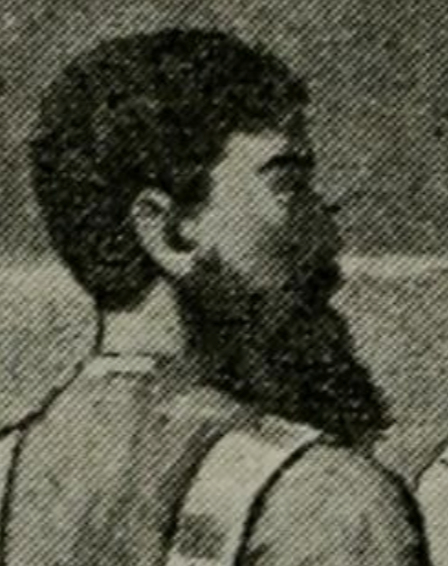
- As depicted in Arrest of Ammon by the Guards of King Limhi (c. 1924)
- Era: Reign of King Mosiah II
- Known for: Rediscovering Nephite colonists
- Family: Zarahemla (ancestor)

In the Book of Mormon, Ammon (/ˈæmən/) is a Mulekite descendant and leader of a Nephite expedition from Zarahemla, sent to discover the fate of Zeniff and his people (who had not been in contact for 75 years). Zeniff and his followers left Zarahemla and travelled to Nephi, their ancestral home, which was then in the possession of the Lamanites. This may have contributed to his expedition, not knowing the actual route to Nephi.

Ammon and his men discover the descendants of the people of Zeniff, who had successfully colonized Nephi but were then enslaved by the Lamanites. Zeniff's grandson Limhi rules under the Lamanites and initially imprisons Ammon. Upon learning who Ammon is, he releases him and rejoices in his arrival. Ammon teaches the people of Limhi the famous sermon of King Benjamin and helps convert them to the gospel. However, he refuses to baptize the converts, "considering himself an unworthy servant". The reason for his apprehension is not given, and the people wait until they reach Zarahemla to be baptised by Alma the Elder. Ammon, Gideon, and King Limhi conspire to escape from the Lamanites by making the guards drunk. The plan is successful and Ammon escorts them to Zarahemla.

== Attributes ==
Ammon is a descendant of Zarahemla, the last non-Nephite king in the land of Zarahemla.

== Etymology ==
According to Hugh Nibley, Ammon (or Amon) is "the commonest name in the Book of Mormon" and "the commonest name in the Egyptian Empire" (which embraced Palestine at Lehi's time, which fell within its Late Period). The name also occurs in the Bible.

== See also ==
- The Record of Zeniff

== Sources ==
- Salleh, Fatimah; Olsen Hemming, Margaret (2022). The Book of Mormon for the Least of These, Volume 2: Mosiah–Alma. By Common Consent Press. ISBN 978-1948218580.
- Thomas, John Christopher (2016). A Pentecostal Reads the Book of Mormon: A Literary and Theological Introduction. CPT Press. ISBN 978-1935931553.
