= Record of Zeniff =

In the Book of Mormon, chapters 9 through 22 of the Book of Mosiah are identified as the Record of Zeniff. These chapters contain the story of a group of Nephites, led by Zeniff, who leave the land of Zarahemla and return to their former land, known as the land of Nephi, which was then occupied by the Lamanites, their traditional enemies. Although the attempt to establish themselves among the Lamanites is successful for a short time, the people of Zeniff are ultimately enslaved and forced to pay tribute to the Lamanite king. They are later rescued by an expedition from Zarahemla sent to discover their fate. The Record of Zeniff records the reigns of Zeniff, his son Noah and grandson Limhi. The timespan is approximately 75 years.

== Background ==
According to the Book of Mormon, the prophet Lehi and his family left Jerusalem and travelled "in the wilderness" for a number of years before building a boat and sailing to "the promised land". The name of the land in which they first settled is not given (though perhaps it was called the land of Lehi). Following Lehi's death, his older sons, Laman and Lemuel, rebelled against their younger brother Nephi, who had been appointed by their father as their leader. Fearing for their safety, Nephi and his followers travelled "for many days" to a new land which they called Nephi (2 Ne. 5:7-8). Afterward, in the Book of Mormon, the descendants of Laman, Lemuel and their followers are known as Lamanites, while the descendants of Nephi and his followers are called Nephites.

Centuries later, after many wars and contentions between the Nephites and the Lamanites, a new prophet, Mosiah, gathered as many Nephites as would follow and fled "into the wilderness", where they discovered the land of Zarahemla, inhabited by a people known as Mulekites (Omni 1:12-13). The Mulekites joined with the Nephites (the two peoples together now being called Nephites) and Mosiah was appointed their king.

== Zeniff ==
About 200 B.C., according to Book of Mormon chronology, Zeniff led a group of people from Zarahemla to the land of Nephi so that they might "possess the land of their inheritance" (Omni 1:27). Rather than attempting to take the land from the Lamanites by force, Zeniff sought to establish peaceful relations by treaty. The Lamanite king, Laman, agreed to give them land previously occupied by his people but Zeniff later realized that the king intended to enrich himself by taking the goods the Nephites have produced. After a few years of peace, the Lamanites began raiding the Nephite settlements, finally leading to two great battles which end in victory for the Nephites. The Lamanites did not attack the Nephites again during the reign of Zeniff, but his people were forced to guard their lands and goods. After a reign of about forty years, Zeniff grew old and conferred the kingdom on his son, Noah. The first person account of the reign of Zeniff is contained in chapters 9 and 10 of the Book of Mosiah.

Grant Hardy says:

Zeniff has a remarkable ability to see the good in others, for earlier record keepers [in the Book of Mormon] such as Enos and Jarom found nothing of value in Lamanite culture... Yet Zeniff, as a man of peace, argues that the Nephites should make a treaty with the Lamanites and regain the land of their inheritance through negotiation rather than conquest

== King Noah, Abinadi and Alma ==
The account of King Noah's reign emphasizes his failure to obey God's commandments. Noah "did not walk in the ways of his father" (Mosiah 11:2), but lived a sinful, idle life surrounded by cronies, including a group of corrupt priests, all supported by heavy taxes on his people. A prophet, Abinadi, was sent to warn Noah to repent and to call his people to repentance. Abinadi prophesied the destruction of Noah and his people if they did not repent. One of the priests, Alma, believed Abinadi but was forced to flee when he tried to defend him. Noah refused to listen to Abinadi and had him put to death by fire.

Alma began to preach Abinadi's message to the people of King Noah and attracted about 450 believers (Mosiah 18:35). When the movement was discovered by King Noah he sent his army to destroy Alma and his followers, but they escaped "into the wilderness". Noah continued his wicked practices, and, because he was more concerned with maintaining his lavish lifestyle than defending his people, he failed to maintain an adequate guard on his kingdom. When the Lamanites attacked Noah's people once again, his priests and many Nephite men fled, allowing the Lamanites to conquer those who remained. When the men who fled with Noah overcame their cowardice and resolve to return, Noah tried to prevent them. He was killed, though the wicked priests escaped.

The account of King Noah is contained in Mosiah 11-19, including an extended discourse by Abinadi in Mosiah 13-16.

== Limhi ==
Limhi, Noah's son, became a tributary monarch, subject to the king of the Lamanites. After unsuccessful attempts to drive the Lamanites off by force, Limhi and his people became resigned to their captivity and were effectively enslaved by the Lamanites.

They were ultimately rescued by a group of Nephites from Zarahemla, led by Ammon (not to be confused with King Mosiah's son of the same name). Ammon and his companions were searching for the people of Zeniff, whose fate was unknown to them. Limhi and Ammon knew that escape by force was impossible and so resorted to a stratagem. After preparing the people for flight, they tricked the Lamanite guards into drinking a tribute of strong wine and escaped while the guards were drunken. Ammon then led them back to Zarahemla.

The account of King Limhi's reign and the rescue of his people is contained in Mosiah 20-22.

== Conclusion ==
The return of Limhi's people to Zarahemla ends the Record of Zeniff. However, events set in motion by Zeniff and his people continue to play out for some time. The fate of the people led away by Alma at the time of Abinadi's prophesying is told in the next two chapters of the Book of Mosiah. (They are also captured by the Lamanites but miraculously escape and join the Nephites in Zarahemla, where Alma plays a significant role in the development of the church.) The wicked priests of King Noah join with the Lamanites and, because of their exceptional hatred for the Nephites, they rise to positions of authority and play a major part in future conflicts between the Lamanites and the Nephites.
