= Book of Omni =

Sixth book in the Book of Mormon

The Book of Omni (/ˈɒmnaɪ/) is one of the books that make up the Book of Mormon, a text that the Latter Day Saint movement regards as scripture. The book is written as the combined composition of several authors, the first of whom, Omni, provides the name of the book. According to the narrative, the book covers more than two centuries of Nephite history within one chapter of text. It refers to wars between the Nephites and Lamanites, the reign of Kings Mosiah and Benjamin, and their participation in the wars and journeys through the wilderness.

== Narrative ==
The Book of Omni is narrated as a combined composition by five different authors, each of which contribute a varying amount of content. The first author, Omni, fought in wars against the Lamanites, but calls himself a wicked man, stating that he has not followed God's commandments. He narrates his section of the book after having possessed the plates of Nephi for 38 years, and is then succeeded in the narrative by Omni's son Amaron. Amaron says that many of the wicked Nephites were killed in war, but the "righteous" Nephites were protected from their enemies. The next author is Amaron's brother Chemish, who explains that he received the plates from his brother Amaron and saw him write his last words. The fourth narrator is Chemish's son, Abinadom, who recounts wars between the Nephites and the Lamanites and says that he has personally killed Lamanites. He also states that he does not know of any additional spiritual teachings that were presented during his lifetime.

The next narrator is Amaleki, the son of Abinadom. He speaks of Mosiah, who was king at the time of his birth; Amaleki explains that King Mosiah led a number of Nephites out of the Land of Nephi and into the wilderness, where they discovered the land of Zarahemla, inhabited by the Mulekites. Mosiah became king over both peoples and taught the Nephite language to the Mulekites. According to Amaleki, because Mosiah was a seer, the Mulekites asked him to interpret a stone that their people had found, telling the story of a Jaredite man, Coriantumr. An early Latter-day Saint scholar of the Book of Mormon, Sidney Sperry, identifies Coriantumr as the last Jaredite king, whose account is found in the Book of Ether. He also speculates that Mosiah translated the stone with an Urim and Thummim.

Amaleki proceeds to say that when Mosiah died, his son Benjamin became king. Subsequently, there was a war between the Nephites and the Lamanites, in which the Nephites were led by King Benjamin.

Amaleki further describes how some of the Nephites wished to return to the Land of Nephi, apparently in an attempt to reclaim it. Two different companies set out in search of the Land of Nephi the first attempt was unsuccessful because the participants fought among themselves, while some time after that, a second group set out. At the time Amaleki stops writing, he says that the second group had never been heard of again. Later, in the Book of Mosiah, it is revealed that the second group was led by a man named Zeniff.

Amaleki closes with some words about Christ, asserting that his words are true and that it is his intent to help others come unto Christ. He states at the close of the book that, having no descendants to carry on the record-keeping, he will give the records to King Benjamin.

== Interpretation ==
According to authors Fatimah Salleh and Margaret Hemming, Omni wrote in order to maintain a record of the genealogical line. His son Chemish, on the other hand, wrote out of obligation. Additionally, Grant Hardy suggests that the contributors to the Book of Omni treated record-keeping as "a genealogical responsibility rather than an opportunity for preaching or testifying." Sharon Harris noticed a genealogical theme throughout Omni and identified three of its purposes. She suggests that the purposes of keeping the genealogy in allows the plates to be passed down, preserves teachings of the prophets, and demonstrates the larger influence of genealogy. Terryl Givens claims that Omni wrote in a manner that suggests he believed the Nephites would eventually die out. Adopting Robyn Warhol's term, professor of English at Vermont University Elizabeth Fenton calls the style of the Book of Omni "unnarration" due to a large lack of events while maintaining a "narrative voice". Out of all the narrators, Amoron is the only one who does not finish his account with "And I make an end."

Throughout the Book of Omni, its narrators claim that God causes the righteous among their people to win wars and punishes the wicked by letting them die in war. Salleh and Hemming take issue with this idea, saying that whether or not someone dies in war does not determine personal righteousness. Sharon Harris points out that the points of contention mentioned by Abinadom and Amaleki lead to bodily injury; from this, she concludes that the usage of "contention" here (and in other parts of the Book of Mormon) carries a more intense connotation than what modern readers think of.

== Works cited ==
- Arnold, Marilyn (1996). Sweet is the Word: Reflections on the Book of Mormon, Its Narrative, Teachings, and People. American Fork, Utah, USA: Covenant Communications. ISBN 1-55503-925-1.
- Fenton, Elizabeth (2013). "Open Canons: Sacred History and American History in The Book of Mormon". The Journal of Nineteenth-Century Americanists. 1 (2). Johns Hopkins University Press – via ProjectMuse.
- Givens, Terryl L. (2009). The Book of Mormon: A Very Short Introduction. Oxford University Press. doi:10.1093/ACTRADE/9780195369311.001.0001. ISBN 978-0-19-936567-8. Wikidata Q114004901.
- Hardy, Grant, ed. (2023). The Annotated Book of Mormon. Oxford University Press. ISBN 978-0-19-008220-8. OL 46783409M. Wikidata Q122259222.
- Harris, Sharon J. (2020). "Omni". Enos, Jarom, Omni: A Brief Theological Introduction. Maxwell Institute for Religious Scholarship. pp. 78–108. ISBN 978-0-8425-0015-9.
- Parry, Donald W. (2007). Poetic Parallelisms in the Book of Mormon. Provo, Utah, USA: Maxwell Institute Publications. ISBN 978-0-934893-36-7 – via ScholarsArchive.
- Thomas, John C. (2003). "Omni, book of". In Largey, Dennis L.; Arnold, Marilyn; Ball, Terry B.; Dahl, Larry E.; Parry, Donald W.; Seely, David R.; Williams, Clyde J. (eds.). Book of Mormon Reference Companion. Deseret Book Company. pp. 621–622. ISBN 1-57345-231-9. Wikidata Q123364479.
- Salleh, Fatimah; Hemming, Margaret Olsen (2020). The Book of Mormon for the Least of These Vol. 1. Vol. 1. By Common Consent Press. ISBN 978-1-948218-23-8. Wikidata Q123378840.
- Sperry, Sidney B. (1995). "What the Book of Mormon Is" (PDF). Journal of Book of Mormon Studies. 4 (1): 14 – via BYU ScholarsArchive.
- Thomas, John Christopher (2016). A Pentecostal Reads the Book of Mormon: A Literary and Theological Introduction. CPT Press. ISBN 978-1-935931-55-3. Wikidata Q123196681.

Book of Omni Small Plates of Nephi
Preceded by Jarom	Book of Mormon	Succeeded by Words of Mormon
