= Limhi =

Book of Mormon king

Limhi Nephite king in the Book of Mormon
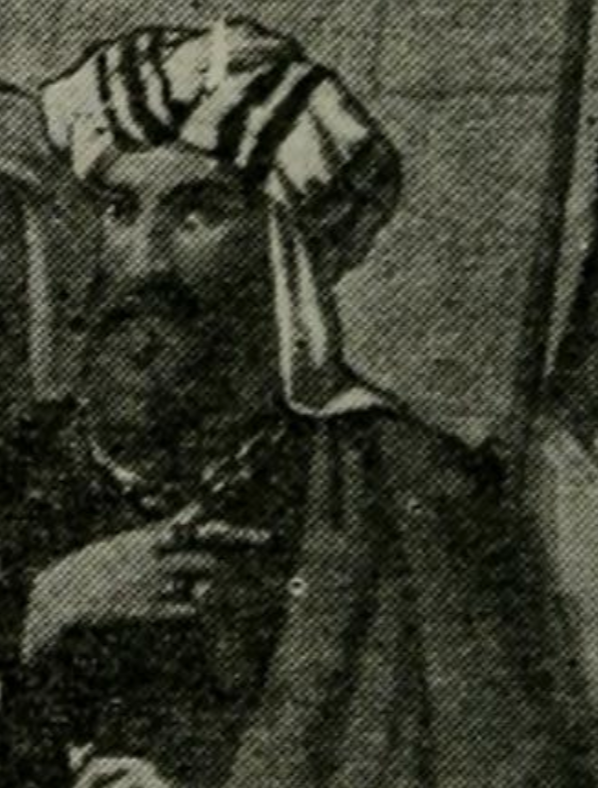
- As depicted in Ammon Arrested by the Guards of King Limhi (c. 1924)
- Era: Before the reign of the judges
- Known for: Last king of the Nephite colony in the land of Lehi-Nephi
- Predecessor: King Noah

In the Book of Mormon, Limhi (/ˈlɪmhaɪ/) is the third and final king of the second Nephite habitation of the land of Lehi-Nephi. He succeeds his father, the wicked king Noah. Led by Ammon (a descendant of Zarahemla, a descendant of Mulek, who according to the Book of Mormon is a son of the biblical Zedekiah, the last King of Judah), Limhi and his people escape from the Lamanites with his people to the land of Zarahemla.

== Synopsis ==
After the death of their previous king, Noah, the surviving members of the Nephite colony living in the land of Lehi-Nephi appoints one of his sons, Limhi, to the throne. Living under occupation by a Lamanite army, Limhi's colonists attempt three violent revolts, all of which the Lamanites quash.

When a band of Nephites from Zarahemla, led by an explorer named Ammon, rediscover the Lehi-Nephi colony, Limhi gathers his community, and he and Ammon read and recite their respective people's histories to each other and before the convocation.

Resolving to escape subjugation, Limhi consults with Ammon about what to do, and Gideon, an advisor, devises a plan to intoxicate and incapacitate the Lamanite guards with a gift of alcohol. The plan is successful, enabling Limhi and his people to flee the land of Lehi-Nephi and travel with Ammon to Zarahemla.

On reaching Zarahemla, Limhi exchanges histories with King Mosiah, ruler of the Nephites there, and their peoples unite.

== Interpretations ==
Records play a significant role in Limhi's arc. Limhi's dialogue includes numerous allusions to and citations from records in the setting, such as the brass plates, Abinadi's trial, and the Record of Zeniff, his grandfather. In the words of John Gee, this implies Limhi "spent a good deal of time studying and memorizing the records of his people" and that he is somewhat bookish, "probably more comfortable in the library than the throne room". According to Gee, this may implicitly be why Limhi's virtuous character diverges substantially from that of his flagitious father Noah. Richard Bushman calls the exchanges and recitations of histories that Limhi participates in "public ceremoni[es]" as part of a pattern where "[i]n the Book of Mormon world, histories nourished and instructed people" and provided the basis "of their conceptual lives". In this interpretation, Limhi's recitation of history with Mosiah and Ammon is a microcosm of the Book of Mormon's self-constructed purpose of unifying world identity by reaffirming the Abrahamic covenant and reinvigorating Christianity.

== Reception ==
=== Visual art ===
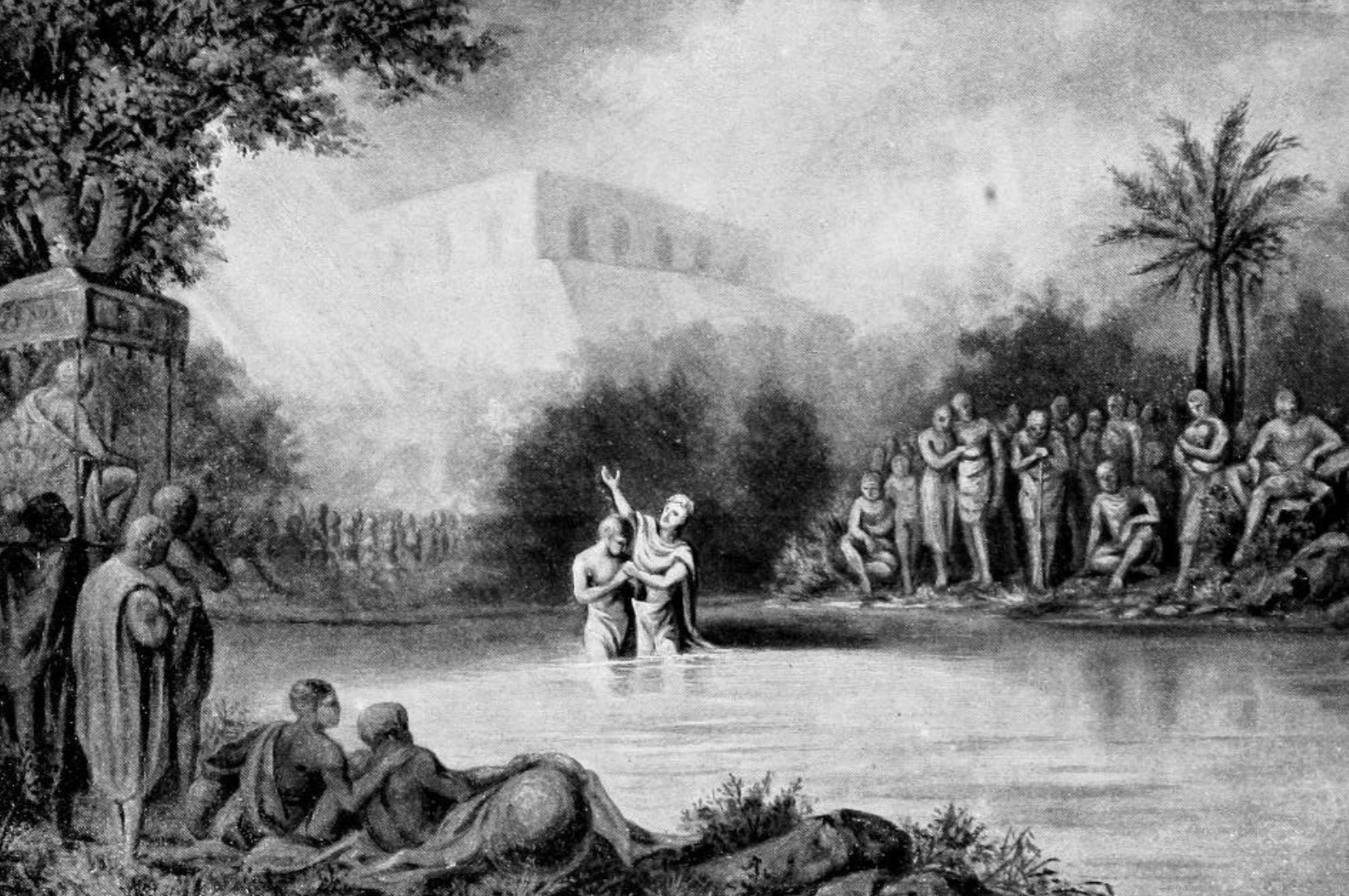
Limhi (left) being baptized by Alma (right) in George M. Ottinger's 1888 Baptism of Limhi

American artist George M. Ottinger's painting Baptism of Limhi, depicting the Mosiah 25:17–18 scene of Alma baptizing Limhi, was completed in 1872 and displayed at the Utah Territorial State Fair that year. The full painting was seven and a half feet by five feet. A version of this image, likely less detailed than the original was, was later published as an illustration in the 1888 The Story of the Book of Mormon.

In approximately 1883, landscape painter Reuben Kirkham produced a panorama of Book of Mormon scenes (the location or survival of which are unknown) which included Last Battle of King Limhi and The Last Battles of the People of Limhi.

=== Namesakes ===
Nineteenth-century Latter-day Saint settlers in territorial Oregon named Fort Limhi after king Limhi. They also named the Lemhi River after the Book of Mormon king's name (albeit misspelled). Lemhi County, Idaho receives its name from a misspelling of Limhi.

== Lineage ==
Zeniff	(unnamed)
King Noah	(unnamed)
Limhi

== See also ==
- The Record of Zeniff

== Further references ==
- Hardy, Heather (2007). "Another Testament of Jesus Christ: Mormon's Poetics". Journal of Book of Mormon Studies. 16 (2): 16–27, 93–95. doi:10.5406/jbookmormstud.16.2.0016.

Preceded by King Noah	King of a tribe of the Nephites ?–124 BC	Succeeded by King Mosiah II
