= Book of Mosiah =

Book of the Book of Mormon

The Book of Mosiah (/moʊˈsaɪ.ə, -ˈzaɪ.ə/) is one of the books which make up the Book of Mormon, a religious text of the Latter Day Saints, first published in 1830.

The title refers to either Mosiah I or his grandson Mosiah II, who, according to the text, were kings of the Nephites at Zarahemla.

Mosiah has 29 chapters and its text starts abruptly without introduction, possibly because its opening chapter(s) were among the lost 116 pages.

== Background ==
According to original research by John Sawyer and John W. Welch, the term mosiah was an ancient Hebrew term. The key meaning of the word mosiah was "savior".

Royal Skousen, a professor of linguistics at Brigham Young University, said contextual evidence indicated that the beginning of the original Book of Mosiah was probably lost in the 116 pages of the Book of Mormon manuscript lost by Martin Harris, meaning what is now known as the first chapter of Mosiah was originally the third chapter. Accordingly, the Book of Mosiah is missing a summary headnote that states its authorship, unlike other books from the Large Plates.

The Mosiah priority theory argues that the original manuscript of the Book of Mormon began not with 1 Nephi (found at the beginning of the Book of Mormon), but midway through, starting with Mosiah. According to Mosiah priority, after the text of Mosiah through the end of the Book of Mormon was dictated, Joseph Smith returned to the beginning and dictated 1 Nephi through Words of Mormon.

== Narrative ==
=== King Benjamin instructs his sons and appoints an heir ===
Benjamin, king of the Nephites and son of the prophet King Mosiah I, has three sons: Mosiah, Helorum, and Helaman. He ensures that they receive a good education, including in Reformed Egyptian. Benjamin's sons also study the plates of Nephi and the prophesies recorded on them, as well as the plates of brass taken from Laban centuries prior. Benjamin tells his sons that the plates are the principal reason that the Nephites have not fallen into disbelief like the Lamanites.

King Benjamin passes the kingdom to his son Mosiah, and tells him to gather the people together at the temple so he can formally announce the succession, passing onto him the plates of Nephi, the brass plates, the sword of Laban, and the Liahona.

=== King Benjamin speaks ===
King Benjamin's discourse in chapters two through five is considered by many readers to be a significant piece of the Book of Mormon. The king spoke of his life in service to the people, and how he even labored with his own hands that the people would not be unduly burdened with taxes. Yet he does not bring this up to boast, only to affirm that he has really been in the service of God. The King served God by serving his fellow human beings. He brings this to their mind as an example. If he, their king, labored to serve the people, then the people ought to labor to serve one another. And if he, their earthly king, merits any thanks from the people, how much more does God their heavenly king merit thanks from them. Yet if the people served God with all their power, they would remain in reality unprofitable servants, because God causes them to exist from instant to instant. The only thing God really requires from them in payment for creating the people and keeping them alive is for them to keep his commandments. He speaks of an angelic visitation and prophecies of Jesus Christ, his birth, identifying his mother as being named Mary, his ministry and miracles, his suffering, death and resurrection. He speaks of Jesus as being the judge, of his atonement as the means to overcome sin and the tendencies of the natural man in order to become a holy person. He emphasizes the importance to have faith in Jesus and to repent in order to become a child of Jesus Christ through His atonement.

He also decrees that his son, Mosiah is the new king. He is the second king Mosiah, as his grandfather (King Benjamin's father) was also King Mosiah.

=== An expedition to the land of Nephi and a story within a story ===
The book changes time narration as it reflects on events that were past but are now being unfolded. The Nephites wanted to know what had happened to some of them who had taken a trip back to the land of Nephi in an attempt to reclaim it. Mosiah sends a small group on an expedition to find out (chapter 7). Some of this small group is met by guards and taken to prison and then brought before a king named Limhi. Limhi tells this group their story and shows the Record of Zeniff, who was the leader of the first group to try to reclaim the land of Nephi. This story within a story encompasses chapters 9 through 22.

Zeniff, whose original mission was to spy on the Lamanites, saw the good among them and desired that they not be destroyed. This led to a conflict in his party which ended in bloodshed. He and those who were not killed in the conflict, returned to Zarahemla. He became over-zealous to inherit the land of his fathers so he gathered others, and they went to take the land, but they were struck with famine because they were slow to remember God. Eventually, they come to a city, and Zeniff and four of his men went to the king. He made a deal with the king of the Lamanites to have a piece of the land of Nephi. He becomes king of this Nephite colony. They had some altercations with the Lamanites, but prevailed at that time.

Zeniff dies and passes rule to his son Noah. Noah is a wicked king. He is one of the more favorite villains among Book of Mormon readers. He collects exorbitant taxes from his people to build a palace and he and his ministers live a life of comfort, ease and self-indulgence. His wicked ways lead the whole colony into wickedness.

=== Evil King Noah and the preaching of righteous Abinadi ===
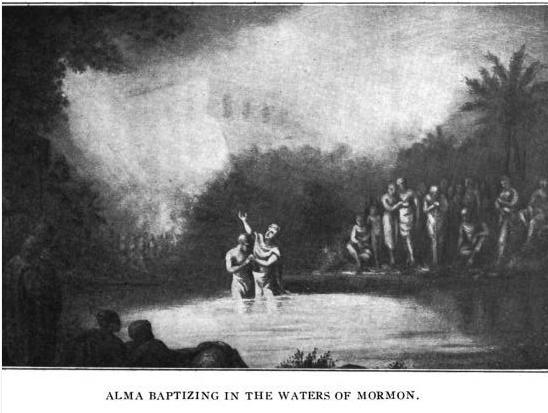
The illustration called "Alma Baptizing in the Waters of Mormon" was published in the book called Cities in the Sun, published by Elizabeth Rachel Cannon in 1910.

Then along comes a man named Abinadi. He is a holy man, a prophet, and he begins to preach that they must repent. He speaks against King Noah and prophecies that he will be killed if he does not repent. Abinadi is arrested and brought before King Noah where he gives what is considered a very important discourse in the Book of Mormon (chapters 12–16). Abinadi asks the ministers what they preach, and they respond that they preach the Law of Moses. Abinadi then tells them that they ought to teach the Law of Moses, but rebukes them for not obeying it themselves, including the Ten Commandments, which he quotes to them. Abinadi then continues to explain that the Law of Moses is a teaching method to prepare people for the coming of Jesus Christ. He speaks of the atonement, faith, repentance and redemption through Jesus. He quotes Isaiah 53 and explains the seed of Christ, the resurrection, and that little children who die are saved in Christ.

King Noah and his priests are angered by this and sentence him to death by fire.

One of King Noah's priests named Alma is stirred by Abinadi's words and pleas on his behalf. He too is accused, and he flees. Alma hides and writes down the words of Abinadi. After a period of sore repentance, Alma begins to preach the words of Abinadi and the doctrine of Christ to the people in secret. He gains a sizable following and in chapter 18, Alma begins to baptize those who have accepted Christ. The Lord tells Alma that King Noah has discovered them and will be coming after them. He and his followers flee the land.

The Lamanites attack King Noah and his people and they begin to run. King Noah tells his priests and others to leave their wives and children so they can escape from the Lamanites. Those that follow this command are later angered at themselves and King Noah for leaving their families. The group sentences King Noah to death by fire. They then turn on the priests of Noah who flee before the people, later becoming the Amulonites. King Noah's son Limhi rules, but becomes a tributary monarch to the king of the Lamanites.

=== All Nephite peoples gather to Zarahemla and the church is organized ===
Although this is not an exhaustive explanation, this is more or less the state found by the small expedition sent by King Mosiah. By the end of chapter 25, both the people of King Limhi, and the people of Alma have been guided by the Lord away from the Lamanites and to the land of Zarahemla. King Mosiah appoints Alma to organize the church. King Limhi and his people are baptized and join the church.

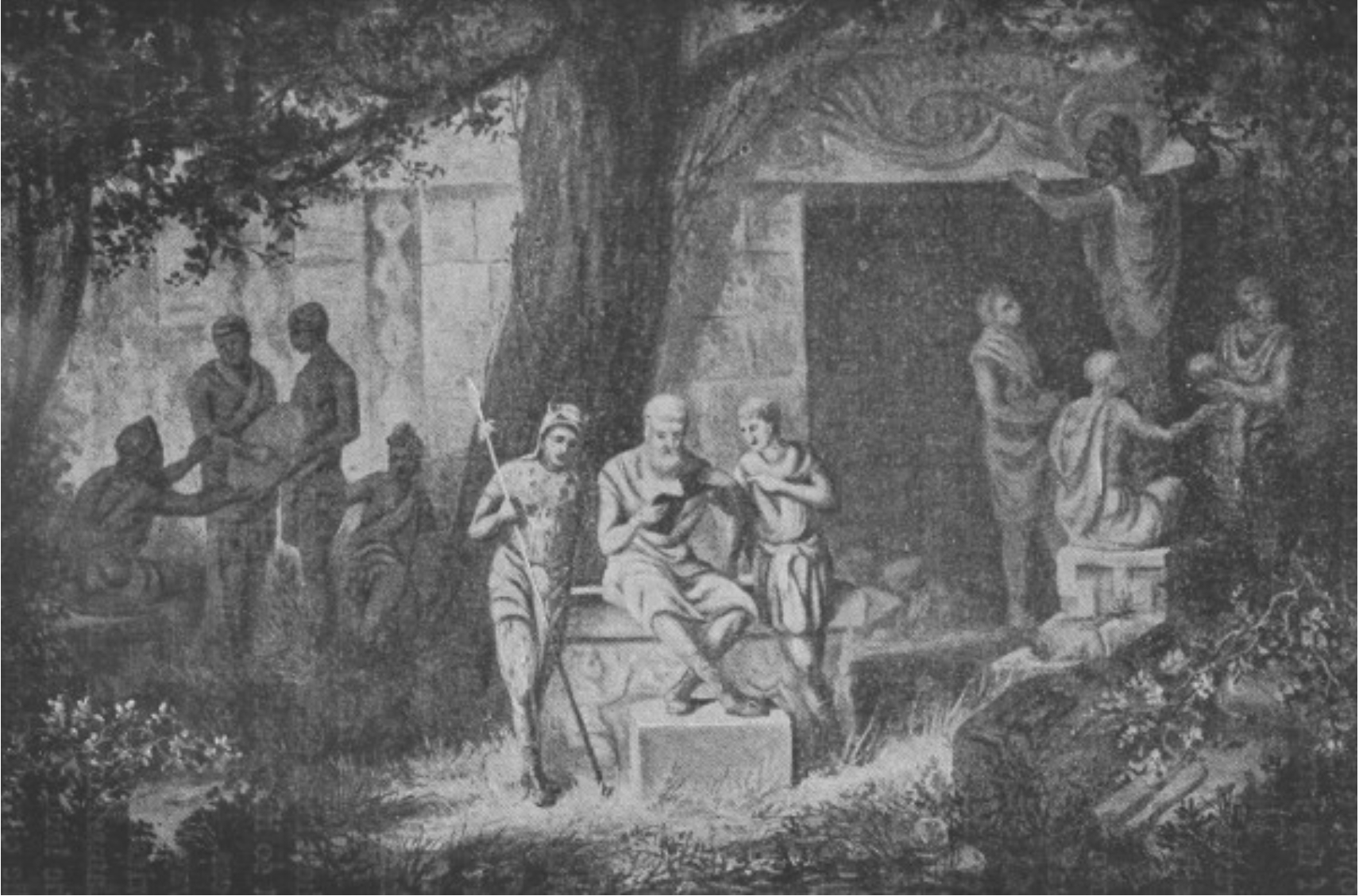
An artistic depiction of the discovery of the record of the Jaredites

Also, King Mosiah by the aid of God translates a set of records which were found by Limhi's people. They tell of a people commonly called the Jaredites. A portion of the record was inserted in the Book of Mormon as the Book of Ether. King Mosiah's grandfather, also named Mosiah, had also translated some writings found on a large stone which touched upon the Jaredites.

=== Conversion of Alma the Younger and the Sons of Mosiah ===
There are problems in the church as a group of the younger "rising generation" do not believe in the teachings. They persuade others to follow after them and not believe in Jesus and the teachings of the church. Alma receives direction from the Lord on the matter and is told that excommunicating those who will not repent is the most severe punishment the church can bestow. The secular government will deal with breaches in the law. King Mosiah makes it illegal to persecute the believers.

Among those who do not believe are a son of Alma who also shares the name Alma (but he is usually differentiated as "Alma the Younger"), and King's Mosiah's own sons. One day while they are out and about doing their destructive work, an angel comes to them and tells them to no longer seek to destroy the church. This sight causes them great fear and Alma the Younger faints. He is in an unconscious state for two days and two nights and his father prays for him. When he comes to, he speaks of having waded through much tribulation and finding redemption through Christ. He speaks in much more detail about this experience in the Book of Alma, chapter 36. The experience causes himself and his associates (King Mosiah's sons) to become converted to the Lord and to build up his church.

Mosiah's sons approach Mosiah and tell him that they want to leave Zarahemla to go to the Lamanites and preach to them. This worries Mosiah, but he asks God who assures him that they will be protected and that they will also do much good there. Their journeys and preaching are described later in the Book of Alma beginning with chapter 17.

=== A new government ===
King Mosiah has a desire to set the affairs of the kingdom in order, as he is getting on in years. Since his sons have gone to the land of the Lamanites to preach, he has no heir to receive the throne. He proposes to his people therefore that they abolish the monarchy and instead organize a republic. He explains that kings who rule righteously are desirable, but once a wicked king comes to power, he spreads evil to his subjects, and it is difficult to remove a wicked king from power. He outlines a system of what are known as "judges" who are popularly elected at different levels of power. The people accept this system, and the elections are held, and Alma the younger becomes the first "chief judge" a title designating the head of the government. He also receives the office of "high priest" of the church, making him the leader of the church as well.

At the end of the Book of Mosiah, Alma (the elder) and Mosiah both pass away.

== See also ==
- Mosiah priority
- The Record of Zeniff

Book of Mosiah Contribution of Mormon (Large Plates of Nephi)
Preceded by Words of Mormon	Book of Mormon	Succeeded by Alma
