= Book of Mormon (disambiguation) =

The Book of Mormon is a sacred text of The Church of Jesus Christ of Latter-day Saints.

It may also refer to:

- Book of Mormon (Mormon's record), the name of a book, or division, in the larger Book of Mormon
- The Words of Mormon, also in the Book of Mormon, and referred to as the "First Book of Mormon" in some editions
- The Book of Mormon (musical), a Broadway musical by Trey Parker, Robert Lopez, and Matt Stone
- The Book of Mormon Movie, a 2003 drama film based on the religious text
- Book of Mormon Videos, a 2019 series
- Book of Mormon characters (disambiguation)
