= Mormon (word) =

Word used for concepts relating to Latter-Day Saints

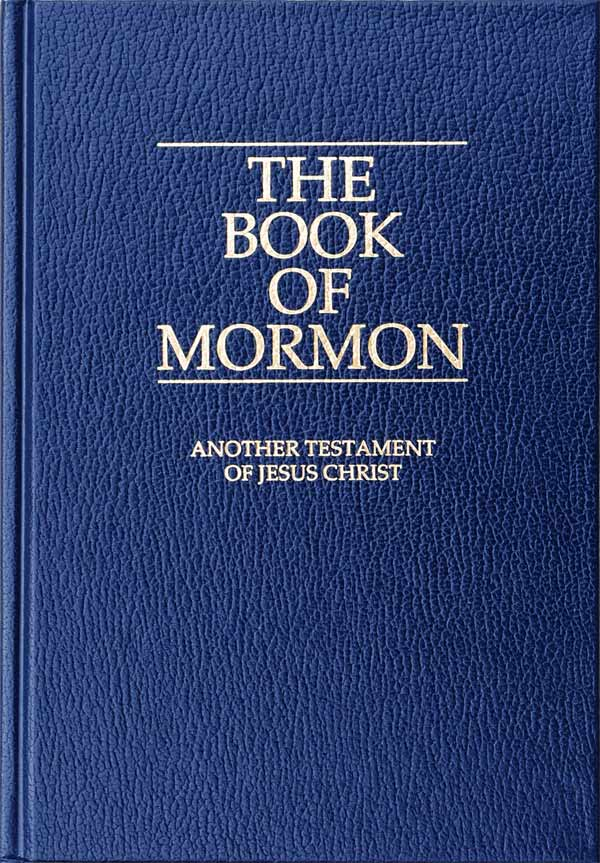
Book of Mormon as printed by The Church of Jesus Christ of Latter-day Saints (2009)

The word Mormon most colloquially denotes an adherent, practitioner, follower, or constituent of Mormonism in restorationist Christianity. Mormon also commonly refers, specifically, to a member of the Church of Jesus Christ of Latter-day Saints (LDS Church), which is often colloquially, but inaccurately, referred to as the Mormon Church. In addition, the term Mormon may refer to any of the relatively small sects of Mormon fundamentalism, or any branch of the Latter Day Saint movement that recognizes Brigham Young as the successor to founder Joseph Smith. The term Mormon applies to the religion of Mormonism, as well as its culture, texts, and art.

The term derives from the Book of Mormon, published in 1830 and regarded by the faith as a sacred text and supplemental testament to the Bible. Adherents believe the book was translated by Smith from an ancient record by the gift and power of God. The text is said to be an ancient chronicle of a fallen and lost indigenous American nation, compiled by the prophet–historian and warrior, Mormon and his son, Moroni, the last of the Nephites.

The term Mormon was applied to members of the church Smith founded in the 1830s by those outside the faith due to early believers only calling themselves "the Church of Christ" and "saints", which was the same terminology used by the Campbellites only a few miles away. Therefore, like the Campbellites, the term "Mormonite" was applied to the new religious movement by outsiders to distinguish it from other Christian sects. The term "Mormon" was later embraced by members of the faith. Different denominations have made efforts in the years since to embrace the term "Mormon" as their own or distance themselves from it.

== Origin of the term ==
The term Mormon is taken from the title of the Book of Mormon, a text adherents consider sacred and believe was translated from golden plates whose location was revealed by an angel to Joseph Smith and which was published in 1830. According to the text of the Book of Mormon, the word Mormon stems from the Land of Mormon, where the prophet Alma preached the gospel and baptized converts. Mormon—who was named after the land—was a 4th-century prophet–historian who compiled and abridged many records of his ancestors into the Book of Mormon. The book is believed by Latter-day Saints to be a literal record of God's dealings with pre-Columbian civilizations in the Americas from approximately 2600 BC through AD 420, written by prophets and followers of Jesus Christ. The book records the teachings of Jesus Christ to the people in the Americas as well as Christ's personal ministry among the people of Nephi after his resurrection. The LDS Church teaches that the Book of Mormon is another witness of Jesus Christ, "holy scripture comparable to the Bible".

The terms Mormonismand Mormonite were originally descriptive terms invented in 1831 by newspaper editors or contributors in Ohio and New York to describe the growing movement of "proselytes of the Golden Bible". Historian Ardis Parshall quotes an 1831 news item, appearing within the first year of the LDS Church's founding, as reading, "In the sixth number of your paper I saw a notice of a sect of people called Mormonites; and thinking that a fuller history of their founder, Joseph Smith, Jr., might be interesting to your community ... I will take the trouble to make a few remarks on the character of that infamous imposter." The term Mormon developed as a shortened version of Mormonite a year or two later. By the 1840s the term was adopted by Mormon leaders to refer to themselves, though leaders occasionally used the term as early as 1833. The term also started to be used pejoratively sometime before 1844 with the coinage of the term Jack Mormon to describe non-Mormons sympathetic to the movement. Since that time the term Mormon has generally lost its pejorative status, as it became reappropriated. According to LDS Church historian Matthew Bowman, and by the end of the 1800s it was broadly used.

== Popular usage ==
Several schisms in the Latter Day Saint movement have resulted in dozens of denominations, each with their own preferred terminology. Today, the term Mormon is often used to refer to members of the largest denomination, the LDS Church, which rejects "Mormon" as a reference term as of 2018. The second-largest sect, the Community of Christ, also rejects the term "Mormon" due to its association with the practice of polygamy among Brighamite sects. Smaller sects often adopted the term, including adherents of Mormon fundamentalism. Due to the size and influence of the LDS Church, it tends to dominate discussions of how Mormon is used.

The term Mormon is frequently embraced by adherents of Mormon fundamentalism, who continue to believe in and practice plural marriage, and consider themselves to be the true successors of the LDS Church or hide among the membership of the LDS Church. Seeking to distance itself from polygamy and Mormon fundamentalism, prior to August 2018 the Church of Jesus Christ had taken the position that the term Mormon should only apply to itself and its members, and not other adherents who have adopted the term. It cited a now-obsolete AP Stylebook which stated, "The term Mormon is not properly applied to the other Latter Day Saint churches that resulted from the split after [Joseph] Smith's death."

== Usage preferred by the LDS Church ==
The terminology preferred by the LDS Church has varied over time. At various points, the church has embraced the term Mormon and stated that other sects within the shared faith tradition should not be called Mormon. At other times, the church has rejected the term Mormon altogether except in extremely limited uses.

The LDS Church has made efforts, including in 1982, in 2001 prior to the 2002 Salt Lake City Olympics, in 2011 after The Book of Mormon appeared on Broadway, and again in 2018, to encourage the use of the church's full name rather than the terms Mormon or LDS.

Around 2010, the LDS Church and its members experienced a "Mormon moment" in which they were thrust into the national spotlight by Mitt Romney's 2008 and 2012 campaigns for President of the United States and the unaffiliated 2011 Broadway musical titled The Book of Mormon. Facing media attention and abundant negative stereotypes, the church actively fostered its "Mormon" nickname with a multinational I'm a Mormon ad campaign (2010-2018), the film Meet the Mormons (2014), and websites like mormon.org and mormonandgay.org.

In 2018, the church reversed course again after Russell M. Nelson became church president. In August 2018, Nelson announced a renewed effort to discourage the use of the word "Mormon" in reference to itself and its members, saying that terms like "Mormon Church" offended Jesus and were a "major victory for Satan". The church followed up with a major renaming, with its websites at lds.org and mormon.org merged to a new website at churchofjesuschrist.org, the Mormon Tabernacle Choir becoming the Tabernacle Choir at Temple Square, and the church-affiliated publishing house Deseret Book beginning to phase out book titles that used the word "Mormon".

In 2018, the LDS Church published a style guide that encourages the use of the terms "the Church," the "Church of Jesus Christ" or the "restored Church of Jesus Christ" as shortened versions after an initial use of the full name. According to church historian Bowman, 'the term "restored" refers to the idea that the original Christian religion is obsolete, and Mormons alone are practicing true Christianity.' The 2018 style guide rejects the term Mormons along with "Mormon Church", "Mormonism", and the abbreviation LDS.

According to Patrick Mason, chair of Mormon studies at Claremont Graduate University and Richard Bennett, a professor of church history at Brigham Young University, this is because non-church members have historically been confused about whether it represents a Christian faith, which concerns church leaders, who want to emphasize that the church is a Christian church. The term Mormon also causes concern for church leaders because it has been used to include groups such as the Fundamentalist Latter Day Saints who continued to practice polygamy after the Second Manifesto of 1904. Mason said "For more than 100 years, the mainstream LDS church has gone to great pains to distance itself from those who practice polygamy. It doesn't want to have any confusion there between those two groups."

In some countries, Mormon and some phrases including the term are registered trademarks owned by Intellectual Reserve, a holding company for the LDS Church's intellectual property. In the United States, the LDS Church has applied for a trademark on Mormon as applied to religious services; however, the United States Patent and Trademark Office rejected the application, stating that the term Mormon was too generic, and is popularly understood as referring to a particular kind of church, similar to Presbyterian or Methodist, rather than a service mark. The application was abandoned as of August 22, 2007. In all, Intellectual Reserve owns more than 60 trademarks related to the term Mormon.

Despite the LDS Church's position, the terms Mormon and LDS in 2023 remain widely used both inside and outside the church to refer to members of the main church and "Fundamentalist Mormon" or "Fundamentalist LDS" to refer to members of fundamentalist splinter groups.

== Scholarly usage ==
J. Gordon Melton, in his Encyclopedia of American Religions, subdivides the Mormons into Utah Mormons, Missouri Mormons, Polygamy-Practicing Mormons, and Other Mormons. In this scheme, the "Utah Mormon" group includes the non-polygamous organizations descending from those Mormons who followed Brigham Young to what is now Utah. The LDS Church is by far the largest of these groups, with a December 2022 membership count totaling 17,002,461 worldwide and the only group to initially reside in Utah.

The "Missouri Mormon" groups include those non-polygamous groups that chose not to travel to Utah and are currently headquartered in Missouri, which Joseph Smith designated as the future site of the New Jerusalem. These organizations include Community of Christ, Church of Christ (Temple Lot), Remnant Church of Jesus Christ of Latter Day Saints, and others.

"Polygamy-Practicing Mormon" groups are those that currently practice polygamy, regardless of location. Most notably, this category includes the Fundamentalist Church of Jesus Christ of Latter-Day Saints (FLDS Church) and the Apostolic United Brethren (AUB).

"Other Mormon" groups include those that are not headquartered in Utah or Missouri and do not practice polygamy, such as The Church of Jesus Christ (Bickertonite) and the Church of Jesus Christ of Latter Day Saints (Strangite).

The terms Utah Mormon and Missouri Mormon cannot be interpreted to mean more than the location of the various groups' headquarters, as the majority of members of "Utah Mormon" groups and "Missouri Mormon" groups no longer live in either of these US states. Although a majority of Utahns are members of the LDS Church, it has a worldwide membership with the majority of its members outside the United States; and most "Missouri Mormons" do not live in Missouri.

== Meaning of the word ==
The May 15, 1843, issue of the official Latter Day Saint periodical Times and Seasons contains an article, purportedly written by Joseph Smith, deriving the etymology of the name Mormon from English "more" + Egyptian mon, "good", and extolling the meaning as follows:

It has been stated that this word [mormon] was derived from the Greek word mormo. This is not the case. There was no Greek or Latin upon the plates from which I, through the grace of God, translated the Book of Mormon. Let the language of that book speak for itself. On the 523d page, of the fourth edition, it reads: And now behold we have written this record according to our knowledge in the characters which are called among us the Reformed Egyptian ... none other people knoweth our language; therefore [God] hath prepared means for the interpretation thereof." ... [The] Bible in its widest sense, means good; for the Savior says according to the gospel of John, "I am the good shepherd;" and it will not be beyond the common use of terms, to say that good is among the most important in use, and though known by various names in different languages, still its meaning is the same, and is ever in opposition to bad. We say from the Saxon, good; the Dane, god; the Goth, goda; the German, gut; the Dutch, goed; the Latin, bonus; the Greek, kalos; the Hebrew, tob; and the Egyptian, mon. Hence, with the addition of more, or the contraction, mor, we have the word MOR-MON; which means, literally, more good.

Whether Smith was the actual author of this passage is uncertain. Official LDS Church historian B. H. Roberts removed the quote from his History of the Church compilation, saying he found evidence that W. W. Phelps wrote that paragraph and that it was "based on inaccurate premises and was offensively pedantic." LDS Church apostle Gordon B. Hinckley noted that the "more good" translation is incorrect but added that "Mormon means 'more good'" is a positive motto for members of the LDS Church.

=== Meaning in the Book of Mormon ===
The Book of Mormon's title page begins, "The Book of Mormon: An account written by the hand of Mormon" (Introduction). According to the book, Mormon compiled nearly 1000 years of writings as well as chronicled events during his lifetime. Most of the text of the Book of Mormon consists of this compilation and his own writings. However, the name Mormon is also used in the Book of Mormon as a place name (e.g. Waters of Mormon). Mormon 1:5 states, "And I, Mormon, being a descendant of Nephi, (and my father's name was Mormon)...", whereas 3 Nephi 5:12 states, "And behold, I am called Mormon, being called after the land of Mormon, the land in which Alma did establish the church among the people yea, the first church which was established among them after their transgression." Based on these verses, Latter-day Saint scholar David Lamb interprets the name of the Book of Mormon to mean "Book of the Restoration of the Covenant":

[The prophet] Mormon was not named after his father; he was named after the land of Mormon. He had been taught about his heritage by his parents and understood the sacred significance associated with the name Mormon. No doubt his father also bore the name Mormon for the same reason. In 3 Nephi 5:12 he gives us a clear indication that the name Mormon is symbolically synonymous with the restoration of the covenant which took place in the land of Mormon by Alma and his people.

A study of the Introduction of the Book of Mormon tells us its main purpose is to restore a knowledge of the covenants to the house of Israel. This adds weight to the understanding that the name Mormon was always associated with the place of the restoration of the covenant to the Nephites. In fact, the name Mormon became synonymous with the concept of restoring the covenants.

In light of this understanding, the Book of Mormon is not named for a man. It is named for the place where the covenant was restored. Symbolically, the Book of Mormon bears the name 'Book of the Restoration of the Covenant.'"
