= Alma the Elder =

Prophet in the Book of Mormon

Alma
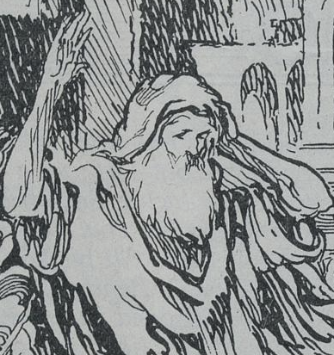
- From Alma Being Carried to His Father's House (October 1925)

High priest
- Preceded by: Office established
- Succeeded by: Alma (his son)

Personal life
- Known for: Founding a Christian church among the Nephites

Alma (/ˈælmə/) is a Nephite prophet in the Book of Mormon. Initially a priest who serves in the court of King Noah, when a prophet named Abinadi preaches to the court Alma concurs with Abinadi and affirms that what the prophet said is true. For this, Noah banishes Alma and tries to have him killed. After leaving the court, Alma goes on to found a church among Noah's subjects. He eventually leads these churchgoers out from Noah's lands, through a sojourn under Lamanite rule, and to the land of Zarahemla, where their ancestors had come from a few generations earlier, where Alma becomes high priest of the Nephites' church.

Alma is sometimes referred to as Alma the Elder to avoid confusion with his son, also named Alma, who is often called Alma the Younger.

== Synopsis ==
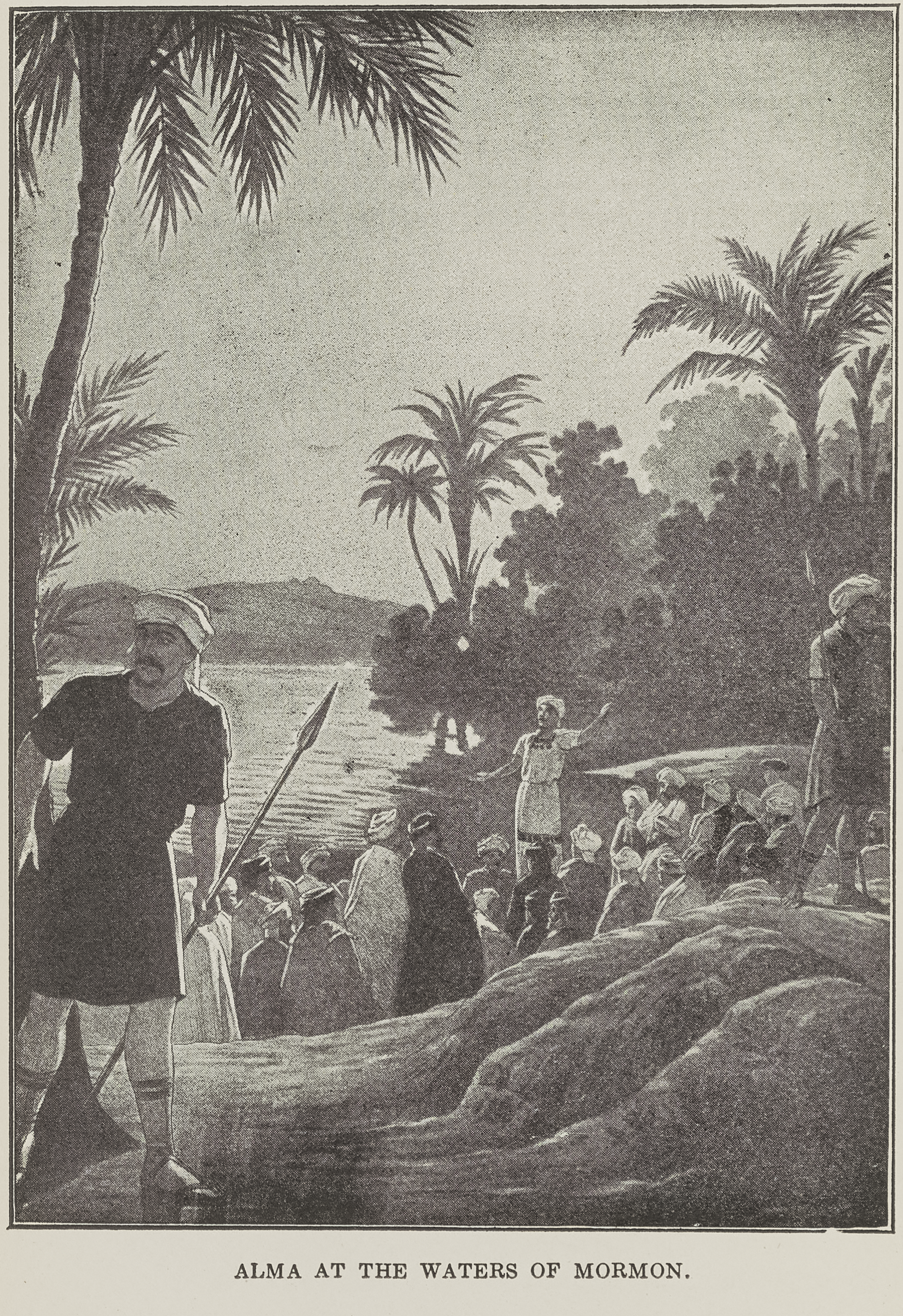
Alma at the waters of Mormon

During the reign of King Noah in the land of Nephi, Alma is one of several priests in his service. When a prophet named Abinadi speaks before the court and condemns Noah and his people for their wickedness, Alma believes Abinadi and affirms that what Abinadi says about them is accurate. For this, Noah banishes Alma and tries to have him killed.

Alma escapes Noah's agents and repents of his sins. In hiding, he writes down what Abinadi taught and propagates this gospel, organizing subsequent followers into a church that he founds. Alma gathers these followers to a place called the Waters of Mormon, where he secretly teaches them and baptizes them en masse. Alma and his church are discovered. Noah prepares an army to attack them. Knowing ahead of time about the impending attack, Alma and his followers flee, traveling into the wilderness, eventually settling in a land called Helam.

An army of Lamanites later discover and conquer Helam, subjugating with Alma his people, and appoint Amulon (a former priest of King Noah, alongside Alma) to oversee the occupation.

=== Return to Zarahemla ===
As the years passed, Alma and his people were discovered by the Lamanites and enslaved, placed under the authority of Amulon—a former priest of King Noah now united with the Lamanites—who began to persecute Alma's people, "put[ting] tasks upon them, and put[ting] task-masters over them" (Mosiah 24:9). Finally, Alma's people escaped the Lamanites and were led by God through the wilderness for twelve days until they arrived in the land of Zarahemla, then the chief Nephite population center. The people of Alma joyfully united with the Nephites and helped to strengthen the church of Christ in Zarahemla. Zarahemla's King Mosiah soon authorized Alma to serve as the first high priest over the Church in Zarahemla. Alma continued in this capacity for many years.

When Alma's son, Alma the Younger, and the four sons of King Mosiah came of age they rebelled against the church and "were numbered among the unbelievers" (Mosiah 27:8). However, as they went about to destroy the church an angel appeared and, in an experience similar to that of Saul on the road to Damascus, they were all converted. Like Saul, their subsequent efforts on behalf of the church overshadowed their previous efforts to destroy the church.

Before dying, Alma bestows leadership of the Nephite church to his son.

== See also ==
- Book of Mosiah
- The Record of Zeniff
