= Mosiah priority =

Theory about the origins of the Book of Mormon

Mosiah priority is a theory about the creation of the Book of Mormon arguing that the original manuscript began not with 1 Nephi (found at the beginning of the Book of Mormon), but midway through, starting with Mosiah. According to Mosiah priority, after the text of Mosiah through the end of the Book of Mormon was dictated, Joseph Smith returned to the beginning and dictated 1 Nephi through Words of Mormon. Mosiah priority is the most widely held solution to questions regarding the sequence of the English text.

== Priority in the Book of Mormon ==
The original transcription of the Book of Mormon by scribe Martin Harris was interrupted by the loss of the original manuscript. The question about the subsequent workflow is known as the problem of priority in the Book of Mormon.

=== Lost 116 pages ===
The "lost 116 pages" were the first manuscript pages of the Book of Mormon, and these were entrusted to scribe Martin Harris (Note: circa April–June 1828) and subsequently lost. Smith subsequently announced a revelation:

Behold I say unto you, that you shall not translate again those words which have gone forth out of your hands; for behold, they shall not lie any more against those words; for behold, if you should bring forth the same words, they would say that you have lied; that you have pretended to translate, but that you have contradicted your words; and behold they would publish this, and satan would harden the hearts of the people, to stir them up to anger against you, that they might not believe my words.

In a preface to the 1830 edition of the Book of Mormon, Smith writes of the lost 116 pages:

I translated, by the gift and power of God, and caused to be written, one hundred and sixteen pages, the which I took from the Book of Lehi, which was an account abridged from the plates of Lehi, by the hand of Mormon; which said account, some person or persons have stolen and kept from me, notwithstanding my utmost exertions to recover it again -- and being commanded of the Lord that I should not translate the same over again, for Satan had put it into their hearts to tempt the Lord their God, by altering the words that they did read contrary from that which I translated and caused to be written; and if I should bring forth the same words again, or, in other words, if I should translate the same over again, they would publish that which they had stolen, and Satan would stir up the hearts of this generation, that they might not receive this work: but behold the Lord said unto me, I will not suffer that Satan shall accomplish his evil design in this thing: therefore thou shalt translate from the plates of Nephi, until ye come to that which ye have translated, which ye have retained; and behold ye shall publish it as a record of Nephi; and thus I will confound those who have altered my words. I will not suffer that they shall destroy my work;

=== 1 Nephi priority ===
Faced with the loss of the 116-page manuscript, creation of a second manuscript began.

The theory of 1 Nephi priority argues that after the loss of the original 116-page manuscript, the transcription process returned to the beginning of the Golden Plates narrative, starting over at the beginning with 1 Nephi. (Note: In order: 1 Nephi, 2 Nephi, Jacob, Enos, Jarom, Omni, Words of Mormon, Mosiah, Alma, Helaman, 3 Nephi, 4 Nephi, Mormon, Ether, Moroni, and finally the Title Page.) Proponents of 1 Nephi Priority included multiple 20th-century authors.

1 Nephi Priority

Lost 116 pages														
1 Nephi	2 Nephi	Jacob	Enos	Jarom	Omni	Words	Mosiah	Alma	Helaman	3 Nephi	4 Nephi	Mormon	Ether	Moroni
First; Transcribed														Last; Transcribed

The lost 116 pages were transcribed first; After their loss, transcription began anew, starting at 1 Nephi.

== Mosiah priority ==
The theory of Mosiah priority argues that after the loss of the original 116-page manuscript, transcription continued in narrative order, beginning with Mosiah and continuing to Moroni. Afterwards, the transcription process turned to replacing the beginning of the Book of Mormon (1 Nephi to Words), roughly corresponding to the material in the Lost 116 pages. (Note: Mosiah followed by Alma, Helaman, 3 Nephi, 4 Nephi, Mormon, Ether, Moroni, Title Page, 1 Nephi, 2 Nephi, Jacob, Enos, Jarom, Omni, and finally Words of Mormon)

Mosiah Priority

Lost 116 pages														
							Mosiah	Alma	Helaman	3 Nephi	4 Nephi	Mormon	Ether	Moroni
							First; Transcribed							Continue transcription at 1 Nephi
1 Nephi	2 Nephi	Jacob	Enos	Jarom	Omni	Words								
Resumed transcription after Moroni						Last; Transcribed								

The lost 116 pages were transcribed first; After their loss, transcription resumed Mosiah through Moroni. Finally, transcription concluded with 1 Nephi to Words.

=== Historical evidence ===
The title page of the Book of Mormon, which Joseph Smith said was found at the very end of Moroni's record, had been completed before 11 Jun 1829. But evidence shows that the translation process still continued after this date. Metcalfe also argues that because the title page mentions Mormon's abridgment and Ether, but not Nephi's record, this suggests that 1 Nephi had not yet been translated.

For some parts of the Book of Mormon text, likely dates of transcription have been identified. This includes the restarting of translation work (referred to in D&C 10 in April–May 1829), teachings on baptism in 3 Nephi (referred to in D&C 13 on May 15, 1829), and a prophecy of the Three Witnesses in 2 Nephi 27 (referred to in D&C 17 in June 1829). The times when these passages were produced corresponds with a sequence and a consistent pace of translation beginning at Mosiah in April 1829 (Note: After losing the first manuscript, the restarted translation work was actually initially begun in Summer 1828. However, other demands in Joseph Smith's life hampered progress and little was produced until a revelation in April–May 1829 (found in LDS D&C 10) recommitted Smith and his scribes to complete the work in haste.) and then arriving at 1 Nephi later that summer.

The pages of the original manuscript containing 1 Nephi are written in Oliver Cowdery's handwriting. However, the first scribes were Joseph's wife Emma and his younger brother Samuel, suggesting that the original manuscript was not begun at 1 Nephi. In addition, a scribe's handwriting in 1 Nephi is believed to be from John Whitmer, who was not involved until late in the translation process, after Joseph Smith had moved back to Fayette, New York.

The beginning of the Book of Mosiah appears to be missing, since it lacks an introduction (unlike all the other abridged books) and its beginning was originally marked as Chapter 3 in the printer's manuscript. This suggests that an earlier beginning to Mosiah may have been in the lost 116-page manuscript and that the current Book of Mosiah immediately continues from that lost text.

=== Textual evidence ===
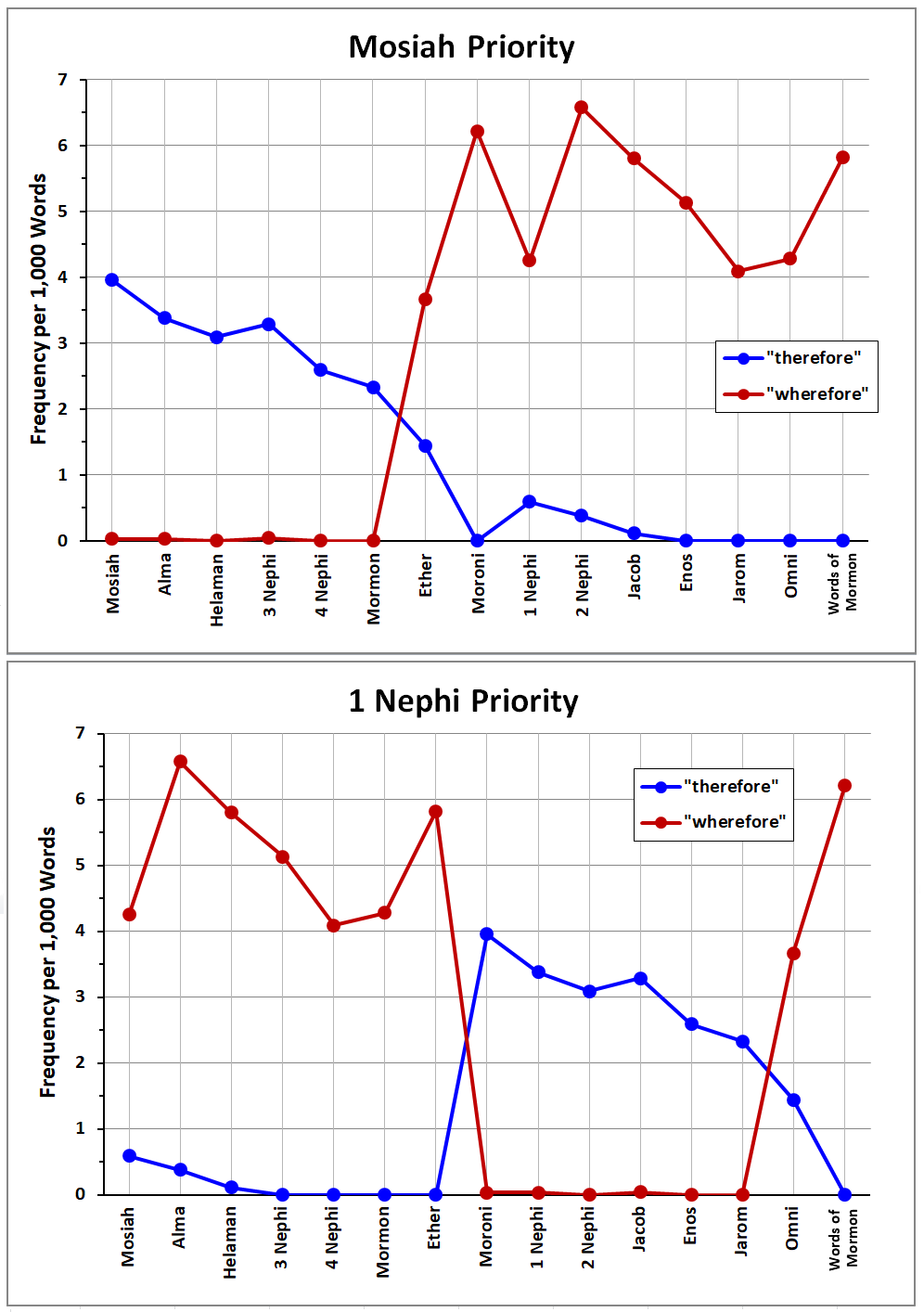
"Therefore" predominates from Mosiah to Moroni. "Wherefore" predominates from Ether to Words.

Textual evidence for Mosiah priority includes the shift in word choices over the transcription process. Scholars examine pairs of words that are roughly synonymous, such as:

- "therefore" and "wherefore."
- "whoso" and "whosoever."
- "inasmuch" and "insomuch."

More recent research has shown that the following graph is partly an artifact resulting from the fact that it is based on total hits in each book. However, Alma has c. 85,000 words, Mosiah c. 30,000, 1 Nephi c. 23,000, and Mormon under 10,000. Other books are smaller. A valid graph must use data standardized for book size. In a recent study, Eccel standardized the data on 5,000 words. The resulting graph showed no gradual shift in style. To the contrary, the radical shift from the Nephi group to the Mosiah-Helaman group, supports the study of John Hilton, which concluded that Nephi and Alma could not have been authored by the same person.

=== Computational studies ===
A 2008 computational study claimed to note patterns which support Mosiah priority, although its methodology has been criticized.

=== Reception ===
The Mosiah priority theory is now well accepted by researchers and in scholarly publications about the text. New Approaches lists proponents of the theory, including Hyrum L. Andrus, Edward H. Ashment, Richard L. Bushman, Edwin J. Firmage, Kenneth W. Godfrey, Dean C. Jessee, Stan Larson, Dale L. Morgan, Max J. Parkin, Jerald and Sandra Tanner, John A. Tvedtnes, Dan Vogel, Wesley P. Walters, John W. Welch, Robert John Woodford, as well as the LDS Institute of Religion manual Church History in the Fullness of Times (1989).

An early response to the theory was published by FARMS. Later publications since Metcalfe's article have agreed with Mosiah priority, including:

- Gardner, Brant A. (2011). The Gift and Power: Translating the Book of Mormon. Greg Kofford Books. p. 245. ISBN 978-1-58958-131-9.
- Gardner, Brant A. (2015). Traditions of the Fathers: The Book of Mormon as History. Greg Kofford Books. p. 213. ISBN 978-1-58958-665-9.
- Givens, Terryl L. (2003). By the Hand of Mormon: The American Scripture that Launched a New World Religion. Oxford University Press. p. 36. ISBN 978-0-19-513818-4.
- Gutjahr, Paul C. (2012). The Book of Mormon: A Biography. Princeton University Press. p. 23. ISBN 978-0-691-14480-1.
- Hardy, Grant (2003). The Book of Mormon: A Reader's Edition. University of Illinois Press. p. xiii, 645–46. ISBN 978-0-252-02797-0.
- Hardy, Grant (2010). Understanding the Book of Mormon: A Reader's Guide. Oxford University Press. p. 10. ISBN 978-0-19-973170-1.
- "Historical Introduction". Revelation, Spring 1829 [D&C 10]. The Joseph Smith Papers. Church Historian's Press. September 1, 2016.
- McBride, Matthew (January 3, 2013). The Contributions of Martin Harris. Vol. Revelations in Context. LDS Church.
- McKay, Michael Hubbard; Dirkmaat, Gerrit J. (2015). From Darkness Unto Light: Joseph Smith's Translation and Publication of the Book of Mormon. Religious Studies Center, Brigham Young University. pp. 125–26. ISBN 978-0-8425-2888-7.
- Skousen, Royal (2009). The Book of Mormon: The Earliest Text. Yale University Press. p. xii. ISBN 978-0-300-14218-1.
- Van Wagoner, Richard S. (2016). "Converting Cousin Cowdery". Natural Born Seer: Joseph Smith, American Prophet, 1805-1830. Smith-Pettit Foundation. ISBN 978-1560852636.
- Wunderli, Earl (2013). "Overview: The Order of Translation and Small Plates". An Imperfect Book: What the Book of Mormon Tells Us About Itself. Signature Books. ISBN 978-1-56085-230-8.

Saints, a four volume official history of the LDS Church, states in Volume 1, Chapter 6 that "Under the Lord’s direction, Joseph did not try to retranslate what he had lost. Instead, he and Oliver [Cowdery] continued forward in the record" and in Chapter 7 that "He was now translating the last part of the record, known as the small plates of Nephi, which would actually serve as the beginning of the book," seemingly supporting Mosiah priority by saying the Small Plates were translated last.
