= King Noah =

Figure in the Book of Mormon

King Noah (/ˈnoʊə/) is a Nephite king in the Book of Mormon who appears in the Book of Mosiah. Noah rules over a colony of Nephites who come from Zarahemla and settle in the land of Lehi-Nephi, succeeding his father, Zeniff. In the Book of Mosiah, King Noah distances from his father's teachings, committing what the text calls "all manner of wickedness". Noah and his priests sentence a prophet named Abinadi, who prophesies of his kingdom's downfall if they did not repent, to death by fire. During a Lamanite invasion, Noah and some of his people flee the land, and those who remain are subjected to Lamanite control. Noah attempts to forbid his men from returning to their families, and they burn him at the stake. Noah is succeeded by his son, Limhi.

Members of the Church of Jesus Christ of Latter-day Saints (LDS Church) commonly label Noah a "wicked king", with his character typically presented in a negative light. Art historians and other commenters suggest that Arnold Friberg's painting, Abinadi Before King Noah, has contributed to many Latter-day Saints' perceptions of the story of King Noah. LDS commentators write that Noah's reign is an example of a system of absolute power and discuss the defining traits of Noah's character.

== Background ==
King Noah first appears in the eleventh chapter of the Book of Mosiah, where he succeeds his father as king over the Nephite colony at around 160 BC. Noah is killed in the nineteenth chapter, at around 145 BC. The story of King Noah directly follows the first-person account of Zeniff, but the narration point of view shifts to the third person.

=== Nephite-Lamanite contention ===
Noah's father, Zeniff, started a Nephite colony within the land of Nephi (also referred to as the land of Lehi-Nephi) by forming a peace treaty with the king of the Lamanites who inhabited the land. The Lamanite king eventually betrayed their agreement, resulting in several land battles between the Nephite colony and the Lamanite people.

== Narrative ==
=== The reign of King Noah ===
In the Book of Mosiah, Noah inherits the kingship over the Nephite colony residing in the land of Lehi-Nephi. Rather than continuing Zeniff's example of leading with faith in God, Noah breaks away from his father's teachings of righteousness. During his reign, he commits "whoredoms and all manner of wickedness." King Noah imposes a 20% possession tax on his people to support his "riotous" manner of living and organizes architectural developments in the land, including a large and ornate temple for his personal use. He has "many wives and concubines" and dismisses his father's priests, replacing them with priests of his choosing. Noah's priests, like Noah himself, are prideful and participate in "whoredoms." The people of Lehi-Nephi accompany King Noah in falling away from Zeniff's teachings, similarly committing sins, becoming drunkards, and worshiping idols.

The Nephite colony's violent contentions with the Lamanite people who also inhabit the land of Nephi do not cease upon King Noah's reign. The Lamanites attack the Nephites’ flocks, and the guards Noah sends are killed. Noah sends an army to push out the Lamanites. The army is victorious, and Noah and his people attribute their success to their abilities rather than to God.

=== Noah and Abinadi ===
The prophet Abinadi preaches to the Nephite colony that they will be "brought into bondage" by their enemies if they do not repent for their wickedness. Abinadi condemns the actions of King Noah and his people, and Noah commands his people to capture Abinadi so he may kill him, but Abinadi gets away. Two years later, Abinadi returns to continue his call for the repentance of the Nephite people, prophesying of their destruction if they refuse. The Nephites bring Abinadi to King Noah, who imprisons him on the grounds of spreading lies about King Noah and teaching false prophecy. Noah and his priests conduct a trial where they decide to kill Abinadi, and Abinadi responds with "the message which the Lord sent [him] to deliver." Abinadi spends three days in prison and is brought back before King Noah. Noah sentences Abinadi to death but is afraid of the prophet's warning of his people's future suffering. Noah's priests convince the king to kill Abinadi despite his fear. As Abinadi is burnt at the stake, he prophesies that King Noah will die in the same manner.

=== Lamanite invasion and Noah's death ===
Alma, one of Noah's priests, believes Abinadi's words and continues his preaching to Noah's people, asking them to repent. Under Noah's direction, Alma is forced out of the land, taking those he convinced to repent with him. A division forms between the remainder of Noah's people, and a man named Gideon leads the group who oppose the king. Gideon's assassination attempt on King Noah is interrupted by a Lamanite invasion. Noah leads a group of his men out of the land of Nephi, his priests among them, leaving their wives and children behind at Noah's command. The remaining Nephites are captured by the Lamanite people and taxed, and Noah's son, Limhi, is made their king. Noah's group turns on him and his priests after Noah forbids them to return to their families. They burn King Noah at the stake, ultimately fulfilling Abinadi's final prophecy that Noah will die as he did.

== Interpretation ==
Grant Hardy, a professor of religious studies, rejects the idea of Noah as the "embodiment of aggressive evil". He instead identifies Noah's character as lazy, greedy, and non-confrontational. Hardy argues that Noah's "vices" were a result of having a "nonjudgmental, tender-hearted, overly optimistic father". Political scientist Ryan Davis, writing for the Journal of Book of Mormon Studies labels the story of King Noah's reign as a characteristic example of a "despotic, autocratic regime".

== Cultural reception ==
Latter-day Saints often call King Noah a "wicked king".

=== Art ===
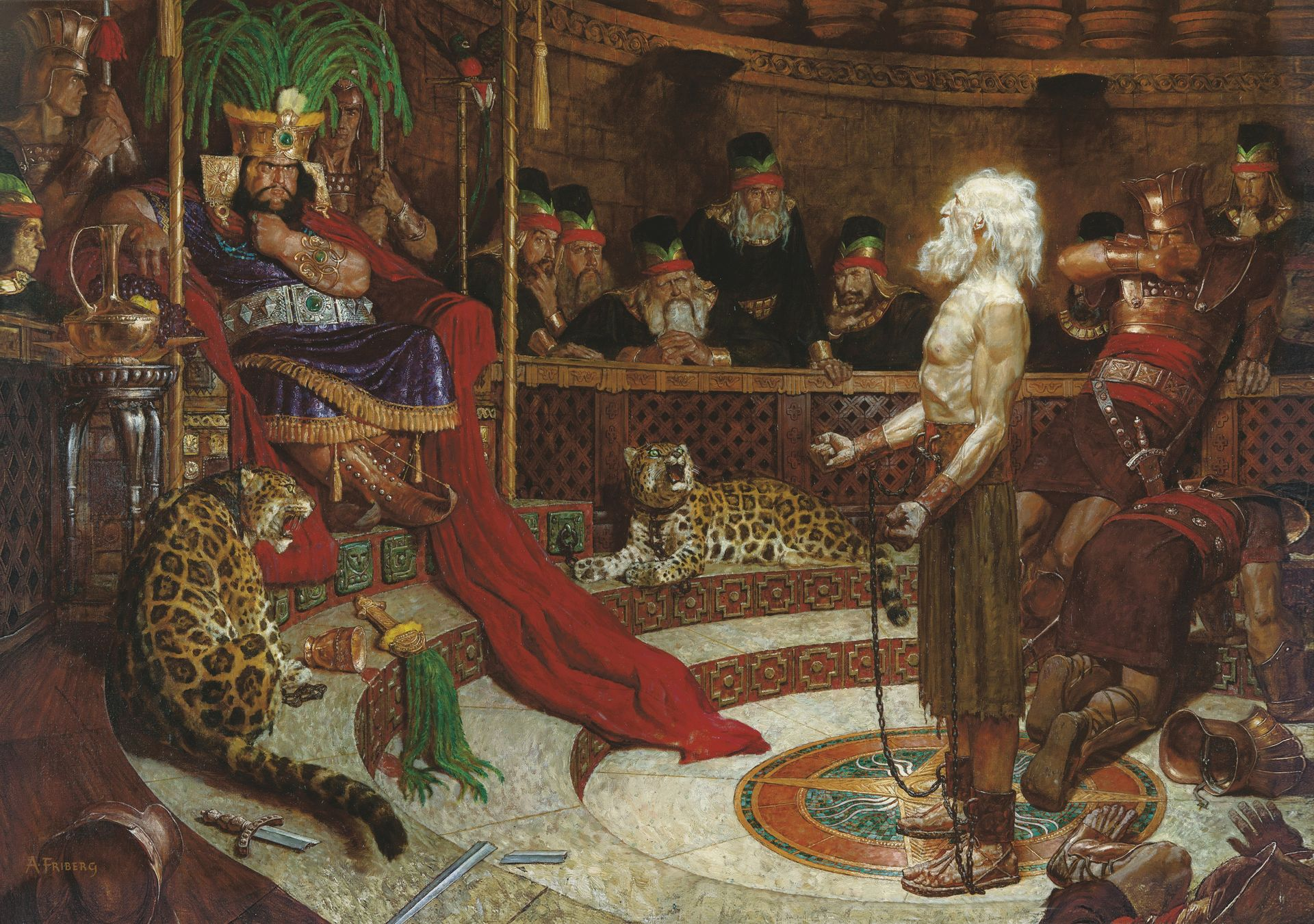
Arnold Friberg "Abinadi Before King Noah"

A painting by American artist Arnold Friberg titled Abinadi Before King Noah visualizes Abinadi's trial before Noah and his priests in the Book of Mosiah. Friberg's Abinadi Before King Noah was part of a series consisting of twelve scenes from the Book of Mormon which were later included in published editions of the Book of Mormon. Noel Carmack states that Friberg's Book of Mormon paintings have contributed to Latter-day Saint perceptions of people and stories within the Book of Mormon.

According to art historian and professor Darren Longman, Friberg's imagining of this scene between King Noah and Abinadi follows an "ethnocentric" narrative where "whiteness is tantamount to righteousness and brownness to iniquity." Longman quotes Dr. Anthony Sweat, an artist and professor of Church History and Doctrine, who described Friberg's painting as "an image with such influence and widespread distribution that it has shaped these artistic interpretations into almost certain facts for an entire generation of church members."

== Lineage ==
Lineage of King Noah

Zeniff	(unnamed)
King Noah	(unnamed)
Limhi

== Works cited ==
- Bingman, Margaret (1978). Encyclopedia of the Book of Mormon. Herald House. ISBN 0-8309-0199-X. Wikidata Q123363520.
- Faulconer, James E. (2020). Mosiah: a brief theological introduction. Brief Theological Introductions. Maxwell Institute. ISBN 978-0-8425-0012-8. Wikidata Q123364070.
- Hardy, Grant (2010). Understanding the Book of Mormon: A Reader's Guide. Oxford University Press. ISBN 978-0-19-973170-1. OL 24418834M. Wikidata Q123382112.
- Hardy, Grant, ed. (2023). The Annotated Book of Mormon. Oxford University Press. ISBN 978-0-19-008220-8. OL 46783409M. Wikidata Q122259222.
- Judd, Daniel K. (2003). "Noah^{3}". In Largey, Dennis L.; Arnold, Marilyn; Ball, Terry B.; Dahl, Larry E.; Parry, Donald W.; Seely, David R.; Williams, Clyde J. (eds.). Book of Mormon Reference Companion. Deseret Book Company. ISBN 1-57345-231-9. Wikidata Q123364479.
- Smith, Andrew; Spencer, Joseph M., eds. (2023). God Himself Shall Come Down: Reading Mosiah 15. ISBN 979-8-386694-80-7.
- Thomas, John Christopher (2016). A Pentecostal Reads the Book of Mormon: A Literary and Theological Introduction. CPT Press. ISBN 978-1-935931-55-3. Wikidata Q123196681.

Preceded by Zeniff	King of a Nephite colony approx. 160–145 BC	Succeeded by Limhi
