= Words of Mormon =

Book of the Book of Mormon

The Words of Mormon is one of the books that make up the Book of Mormon, a text that is held sacred in the Latter Day Saint movement. It consists of a single chapter of eighteen verses and is the only book in the text which is not titled as a "book." According to the text, it is a comment inserted by the prophet Mormon while compiling the records which became the Book of Mormon.

Textually, Words of Mormon serves to link the Small Plates of Nephi, which precede it in the current printed version, but which would have been placed after Mormon's full record in the golden plates, with the rest of the Book of Mormon.

== Narrative ==
Mormon explains that, while abridging the history of the Nephites, he came across the Small Plates of Nephi and decided to make them an appendix to his finished work. He then briefly summarises the reign of King Benjamin, the last king named in the Small Plates.

Mormon writes that King Benjamin, wielding the sword of Laban, stood against the Lamanites. With his efforts, and wisdom, and the help of the prophets, King Benjamin established peace in the land. Mormon also talks about how false Christs went among the people and were confounded.

Structure
Topic	Verses
Future of the Nephite people	1–2
The small plates	2–8
King Benjamin	12–14
False Christs; peace restored	15–18

== Interpretation ==
=== Suggested purposes ===
Words of Mormon verses 12–18 have continuity with the first part of Mosiah; Jack M. Lyon and Kent R. Minson hypothesize it was originally dictated as part of a now missing portion of the Book of Mosiah. Brant Gardner suggests that Joseph Smith wrote verses 12–18 as a summary or bridge back into the large plates and that these verses were not part of the original dictation. In another perspective, religious studies scholar Grant Hardy states that that Mormon's mention of King Benjamin links the Book of Omni with the Book of Mosiah.

Mormon narrates that he does not know why he is including the small plates with the large ones. Latter Day Saints believe that the inclusion serves as a replacement for the 116 pages that were lost during translation of the Book of Mormon. Author Benjamin Keogh suggests that Mormon's explanation indicates that he views the inclusion of the small plates as an appendix to the larger record. Keogh further suggests that, for the small plates, Words of Mormon may serve a similar purpose as the title page of the Book of Mormon.

=== Style ===
Donald W. Parry broke up the Book of Mormon into its chiastic and other poetic patterns. In Words of Mormon, he identified two instances of chiasmus: The first appears in verses 3-11 with an "ABcbcacababCDEFFEDCBabcA" pattern; the second is in verses 15–16 with an "abcabc" pattern.

In an article about the Words of Mormon, theologian Benjamin Keogh searched for meaning in Mormon's frequent use of "these". He suggested that Mormon may be referencing prophets, holy men, or the plates themselves.

=== Suggested prejudice ===
The authors Fatimah Salleh and Margaret Hemming claim that throughout the narrative of the Book of Mormon, the Nephites are prejudiced toward the Lamanites. They point out that in Words of Mormon, the author calls the Lamanites the brethren of his people, yet avoids calling them his own brethren. This, Salleh and Hemming claim, is connected to inherent Nephite prejudice.

== Works cited ==
- Hardy, Grant, ed. (2023). The Annotated Book of Mormon. Oxford University Press. ISBN 978-0-19-008220-8. OL 46783409M. Wikidata Q122259222.
- Keogh, Benjamin (2018). ""With the help of these": Words of Mormon 1:18" (PDF). Journal of Book of Mormon Studies. 27 (1).
- Parry, Donald W. (2007). Poetic Parallelisms in the Book of Mormon. Provo, Utah, USA: Maxwell Institute Publications. pp. 156–157. ISBN 978-0-934893-36-7 – via ScholarsArchive.
- Salleh, Fatimah; Hemming, Margaret Olsen (2020). The Book of Mormon for the Least of These Vol. 1. Vol. 1. By Common Consent Press. ISBN 978-1-948218-23-8. Wikidata Q123378840.
- Thomas, John C. (2003). "Words of Mormon". In Largey, Dennis L.; Arnold, Marilyn; Ball, Terry B.; Dahl, Larry E.; Parry, Donald W.; Seely, David R.; Williams, Clyde J. (eds.). Book of Mormon Reference Companion. Deseret Book Company. pp. 793–794. ISBN 1-57345-231-9. Wikidata Q123364479.
- Thomas, John Christopher (2016). A Pentecostal Reads the Book of Mormon: A Literary and Theological Introduction. CPT Press. ISBN 978-1-935931-55-3. Wikidata Q123196681.

Words of Mormon Contribution of Mormon
Preceded by Omni	Book of Mormon	Succeeded by Mosiah
