= Zeniff, Arizona =

- Ghost town
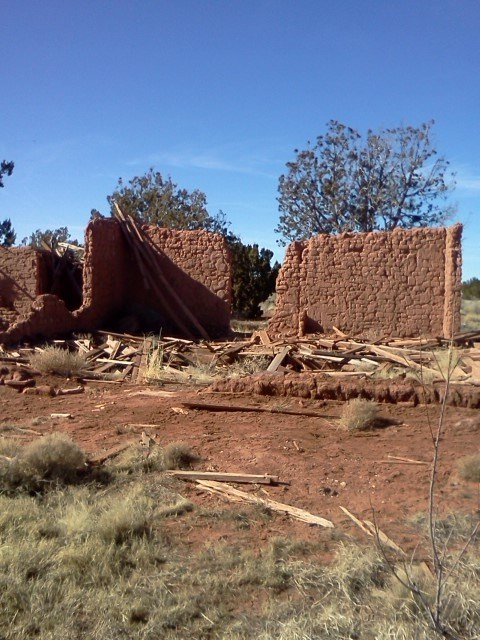

- Location within Arizona Location within the United States
- Coordinates: 34°34′39″N 110°22′43″W
- Country: United States
- State: Arizona
- County: Navajo
- Founded: 1911
- Abandoned: 1956
- Founder: Preston Bushman
- Named for: Zeniff, Book of Mormon
- Elevation: 5,889 ft (1,795 m)
- Time zone: UTC-7 (MST (no DST))
- GNIS ID(s): 36502

Zeniff was a town in Navajo County, Arizona located approximately 15 miles SW of Holbrook, Arizona off SR 377, near "Dry Lake".

== History ==
It was settled in 1911 by the Preston Bushman family with the goal of dry farming. Preston's father, John Bushman, had previously helped settle Heber, Arizona, and Preston dreamed of staking a claim for himself.

Upon arrival, dams were erected and wells were dug to provide essential drinking water. The Bushmans were joined by the Gardner, Heward and Hunt families that year. All land was purchased from the Aztec Land and Cattle Company. Water was in short supply and the soil was rocky. Owning water rights to various draws was essential for survival.

At this time, Zeniff consisted primarily of single room adobe cabins and frame houses. Dry farming and cattle ranching were the primary way of life. Residents occupied their time with farming, canning, herding, and playing cards. Music was an integral part of residents lives both at home and at school. A single room log cabin schoolhouse contained pupils from 1st through 8th grade. After 8th grade, children moved to Snowflake, during the winter, to attend the "Stake Academy". In 1922, the U.S. Post Office was established, requiring settlers to name the town. Residents chose "Zeniff", after the Book of Mormon. The Zeniff U.S. Post Office was in operation until 1933.

Zeniff's location on the cattle trail meant that it was an important layover for cattle drives to Holbrook. Being a guaranteed water source with fenced pastures for cattle, cowboys often made Zeniff a routine stop. In November 1927, some of Zeniff's landowners met in Snowflake to form a corporation "to acquire land through purchase of lease for farming or grazing or sub-leasing to others." By June 1928, fifty acres of corn were planted, in addition to oats and clovers for yearling calves. A loan of $2000 was obtained for operating capital. By December 1928, little had been accomplished aside from proposals of what should be done. It was decided that an additional $7500 would be required to get the company moving. In order to finance farming that summer and purchase sheep for the fall, the corporation mortgaged their stock. By November 1931, it was decided that the company had failed, and all assets were divided up amongst shareholders. It is unknown if the failure was due to indecisiveness, poor management, lack of capitalization or any combination of the three. Land held by the company was sold off at a rate of $10 per acre for bottom land, and $3 per acre for pasture land.

Additional families had arrived in Zeniff by the late 1920s, further stretching the low water supply. These families included the Fred Baca family (from Wilford), and the Burke Prince family from "Turkey Springs Creek". New wells were dug, in 1933, to provide fresh drinking water after older wells had run dry. It took 10 men, 2 weeks to accomplish this feat. Prior to this, water had to be hauled from 3 miles away in order to water crops.

In 1934, the Bushman family purchased a sizable herd of cattle, stretching the family beyond their financial limits. Mr. Bushman signed a $2,700 mortgage to pay for the cattle. In 1937, to avoid defaulting on the mortgage, a "mutually beneficial" contract was drawn up by Fred Turley (family friend and local dude ranch owner). Mr. Turley was to receive deeded and leased land, and access to 2 stock watering tanks in trade for cancellation of the Bushman mortgage. Mr. Bushman trusted his friend, and signed the document. After acquiring the Bushman mortgage, Mr. Turley showed his true intentions and assigned the Bushman mortgage to himself, rather than canceling it. He then demanded additional water rights of the Bushmans. Next, demands were made for full ownership of two Bushman water reservoirs, and half of a third. When these demands were refused, Mr. Turley foreclosed on the Bushmans' mortgage. The Bushmans took the Turleys to High Counsel court, but the court ruling upheld Mr. Turley's actions. The Bushmans were forced to abandon Zeniff, relocating to Mesa, Arizona, in 1938.

Following the Bushmans' departure, other families began relocating as well. The Hewards sold to the Despains, and the Hunts sold to the Tenneys who in turn sold to the Despains. Eventually the Despains owned a majority of the land. In 1956, Southwest Forest Industries purchased all of the land to build a paper pulp mill with the intent of using the "Dry Lakes" for waste water storage. At this time the land became unlivable due to the offensive odor coming from the lakes. The paper mill ran until September 30, 2012, when it shut down permanently. Today, three adobe buildings and a set of stone walls are all that remain of Zeniff.

== See also ==
- The Church of Jesus Christ of Latter-day Saints in Arizona
