= Abinadi =

Prophet in the Book of Mormon

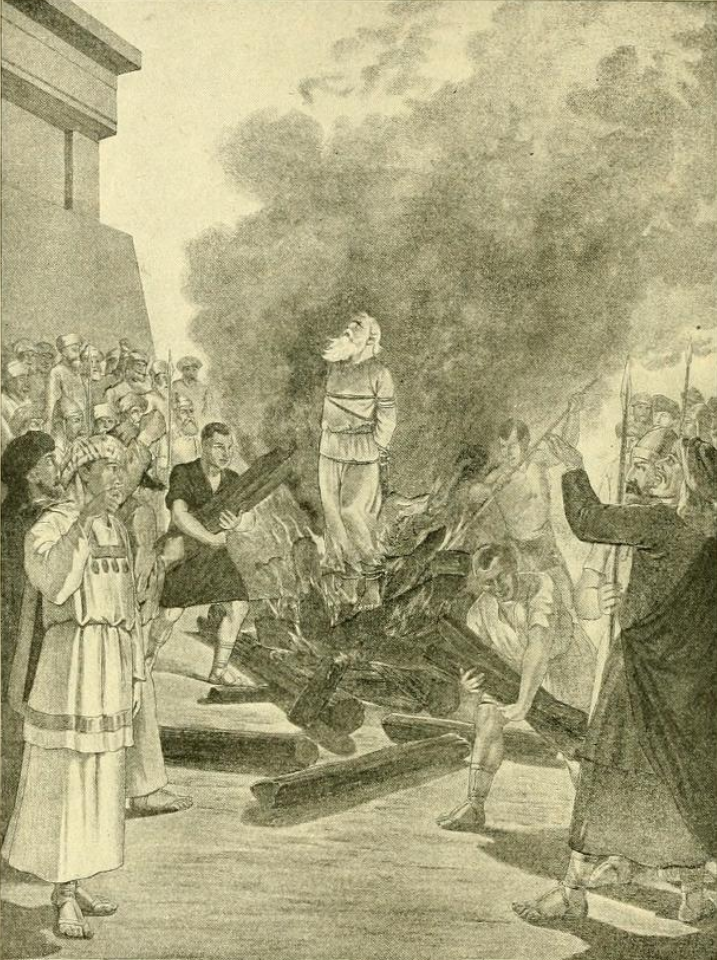
Depiction of the death of Abinadi

According to the Book of Mormon, Abinadi (/əˈbɪnədaɪ/) was a prophet who lived on the American continent about 150 BC. In the Book of Mormon account, Abinadi visited the court of King Noah at Lehi-Nephi, and pleaded for them to repent of their iniquity and live the law of Moses. Abinadi also gave Noah the message of the coming of the Lord Jesus Christ to earth in the flesh, to live among the children of men. Noah and his priests threatened Abinadi that unless he recalled all the words he had said against him and his priests, they would kill him. Abinadi stood by his words and Noah had him burned with fire. One of Noah's priests, Alma the Elder, adhered to Abinadi's message and eventually became a prophet himself.

== Etymology ==
According to Todd Parker, the name "Abinadi" (Mosiah 11:20) appears to be symbolic. In Hebrew, ab means "father", abi means "my father", and nadi is "present with you", so the name Abinadi may reflect his mission; it may mean something like "my father is present with you." In the Book of Mormon account, the alleged reason for killing him was because Abinadi claimed that God would come down and would be with man (see Mosiah 15:1–7). That was the charge of blasphemy they finally used to put him to death (Mosiah 17:8).

== Praise ==
M. Russell Ballard of the Quorum of the Twelve Apostles praised Abinadi for courage and obedience: "Abinadi infuriated wicked King Noah with his courageous testimony of the Lord Jesus Christ. Eventually this great missionary offered the ultimate sacrifice for his witness and faith but not before his pure testimony touched one believing heart. Alma, one of King Noah's priests, 'repented of his sins ... , [accepted Jesus as the Christ,] and went about privately among the people, and began to teach the words of Abinadi' (Mosiah 18:1). Many were converted to the gospel of Jesus Christ as a direct result of Abinadi's powerfully borne testimony of the Savior, believed by one soul, Alma."

While serving in the Seventy, Cree-L Kofford discussed Abinadi's influence: "What is there that is so special about Abinadi? Perhaps it was his total obedience as he went, presumably alone, among those whom he must have known would take his life, to deliver the word of the Lord and to cry repentance to the people. Perhaps it is the very fact that we know so little about him, or perhaps it was simply the way with which he faced the adversities which came into his life in such a straightforward, 'square-to-the world' way. Whatever the reason, Abinadi was and is special. His life, lived so long ago, still has the power to excite the mind and cause the pulse to pound."

== Comparison to King Benjamin ==
According to Todd Parker, there are many similarities between the speeches of King Benjamin and Abinadi.

== See also ==
- Book of Mosiah
- Linguistics and the Book of Mormon
- List of Book of Mormon people
