= Waters of Mormon =

Place in the Book of Mormon

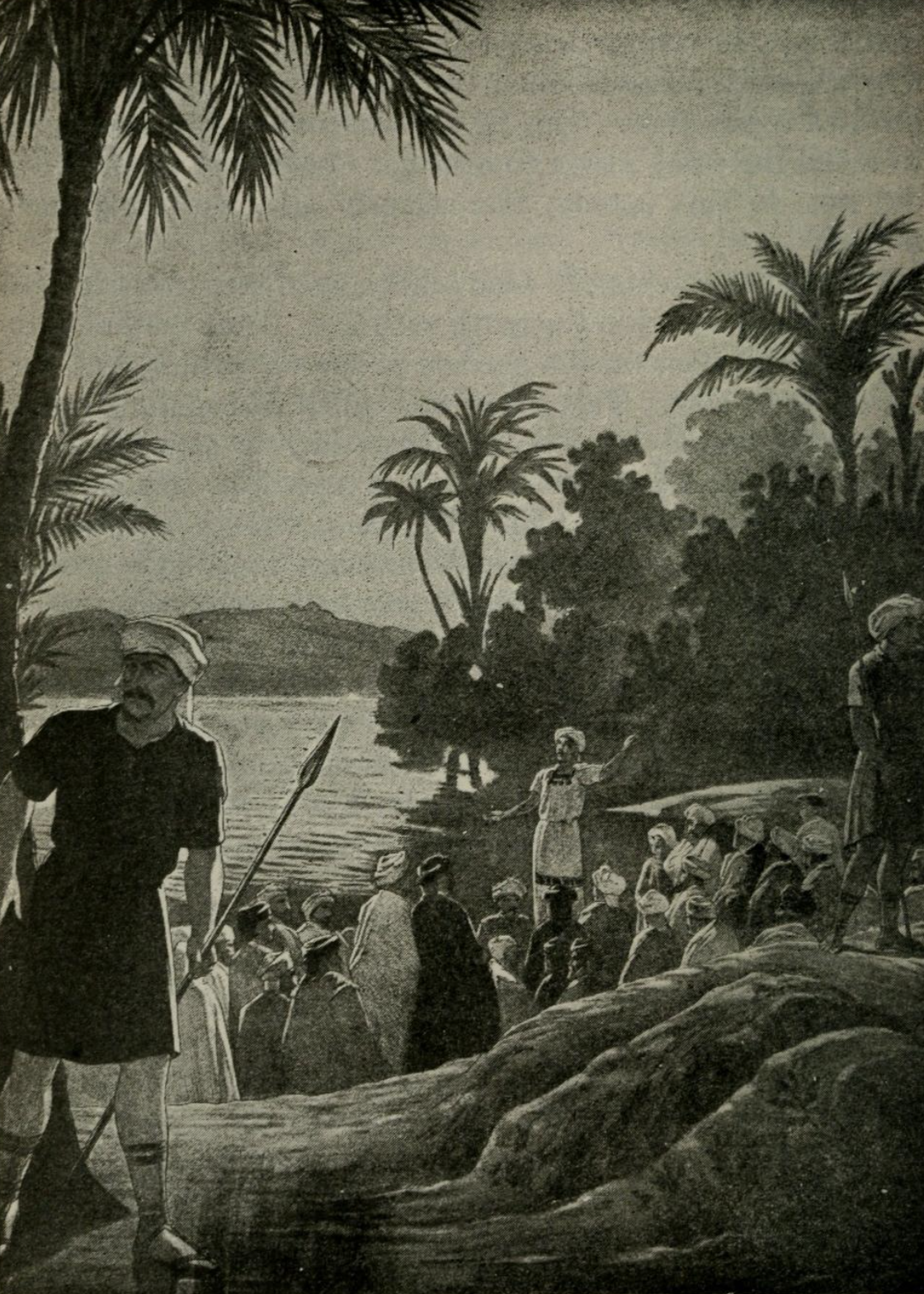
- Alma at the Waters of Mormon (c. 1924)
- First appearance: Mosiah 18
- Last appearance: Alma 5
- Type: Body of water
- Location: Land of Lehi-Nephi
- Significance: Site of baptisms

In the Book of Mormon, the waters of Mormon is a body of water where about two hundred Nephites are baptized.

== Summary ==
In Mosiah 18, Nephites living in King Noah's territory who want to listen to Alma's secret preaching gather to a place called the waters of Mormon. In the process of this preaching, Alma proceeds to invite the listeners to be baptized. Two hundred and four people are baptized, and Alma establishes a church.

Later in the Book of Mormon, Mosiah 5, Alma's son, also named Alma, gives a sermon in which he recapitulates the history of the Nephite church and tells his audience the baptisms in the waters of Mormon.

== Sources ==
- Bolton, Andrew (Spring 2004). "Anabaptism, the Book of Mormon, and the Peace Church Option". Dialogue: A Journal of Mormon Thought. 37 (1): 75–94. doi:10.2307/45227045. JSTOR 45227045.
- Carmack, Noel A. (2008). "'A Picturesque and Dramatic History': George Reynolds's Story of the Book of Mormon". Brigham Young University Studies. 47 (2): 115–141. ISSN 0007-0106. JSTOR 43044637.
- Hangen, Tona (2015). "Lived Religion Among Mormons". In Givens, Terryl L.; Barlow, Philip (eds.). Oxford Handbook of Mormonism. Oxford University Press. pp. 209–226. ISBN 978-0-19-977836-2.
- Hardy, Heather (2007). "Another Testament of Jesus Christ: Mormon's Poetics". Journal of Book of Mormon Studies. 16 (2): 16–27, 93–95. doi:10.5406/jbookmormstud.16.2.0016. ISSN 1065-9366.
- Hardy, Grant (2010). Understanding the Book of Mormon: A Reader's Guide. Oxford University Press. ISBN 9780199745449.
- Smith, Daymon Mickel (2015). "Fragmenting the Book of Mormon Imaginary". In Wimbush, Vincent L. (ed.). Scripturalizing the Human: The Written as the Political. Routledge. pp. 78–105. ISBN 978-1-138-92000-2.
- Stott, G. St. John (2006). "A Conjectural Reading of the Book of Mormon". Forum for Modern Language Studies. 42 (4): 447–458. doi:10.1093/fmls/cql075.
- Thomas, John Christopher (2016). A Pentecostal Reads the Book of Mormon: A Literary and Theological Introduction. CPT Press. ISBN 9781935931553.
- Whitley, Edward (Fall 2021). "Book of Mormon Poetry". Dialogue: A Journal of Mormon Thought. 54 (3): 178–183. doi:10.5406/dialjmormthou.54.3.0178.
