= Zeniff =

Nephite king in the Book of Mormon

- King of the Nephites in Lehi-Nephi and Shilom
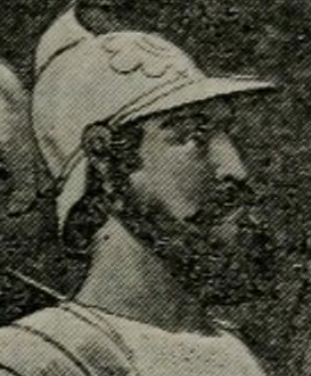
- As depicted in Zeniff's Treaty with King Laman (c. 1924)
- Reign: ~40 years
- Successor: Noah

Zeniff (/ˈziːnɪf/) is a king in the Book of Mormon whose personal account is recorded in the Book of Mosiah. He is the father of King Noah and the grandfather of King Limhi. Zeniff is the first king of Nephite colonists who come from Zarahemla and settle in the land of Lehi-Nephi. The Nephites believe this land to be rightfully theirs by inheritance (as it was the homeland of the early Nephites), even attempting to reclaim the land by force. In an expedition in which he spies for the Nephites, Zeniff claims to see good in the Lamanite inhabitants. He argues against a militaristic approach and causes an internal battle among the Nephite army. Zeniff later leads a group of Nephites back to Lehi-Nephi and establishes a peace treaty with the Lamanite king whose people inhabit the land. Zeniff's people prosper with him as king, but the Lamanite king betrays their treaty and attempts to exploit them. Zeniff and his people successfully fight off the Lamanites' multiple aggressions, and Zeniff's reign lasts about forty years, after which he passes the kingship to one of his sons, Noah. Scholarly interpretations have highlighted Zeniff's shifting perceptions of Lamanites, such as how his opinion changes when his people contends with the Lamanites and the role that Zeniff's narration plays in racializing Lamanites in the Book of Mormon.

== Narrative ==
Zeniff participates in two separate expeditions to reclaim the land of Lehi-Nephi, which the Nephites believed to be "the land of [their] inheritance", as it was the homeland of the early Nephites. In the first attempt, recorded briefly in the Book of Omni and again in Zeniff's personal account, an army of Nephites journeys to the land of Lehi-Nephi to reclaim the land through force. Zeniff is among this group. He is sent as a spy to gather information for the Nephite army to plan a military attack on the Lamanites who inhabit the land. However, Zeniff claims to see "good" among the Lamanites and decides they should not be destroyed. He suggests that the Nephites instead establish a treaty with the Lamanites for the land. His argument goes against the orders of their expedition's "blood-thirsty" leader, who sentences Zeniff to death. Fighting breaks out among the Nephites, ultimately saving Zeniff, which results in the death of a majority of the army. Fifty survivors of this internal battle return to Zarahemla, while others disappear into the wilderness.

In his personal record, Zeniff describes himself as "over-zealous to inherit the land of our fathers", and in around 200 BCE, he gathers another group of Nephites and returns to the land of Lehi-Nephi. Zeniff appeals to Laman, the king of the Lamanites, and establishes a peace treaty that allows Zeniff's cohort to settle in the land. King Laman grants Zeniff the lands of Lehi-Nephi and Shilom after commanding the Lamanites in those lands to depart. The Nephites settle in the lands, and Zeniff becomes king.

The people of Zeniff live peacefully for twelve years, but Zeniff begins to realize that King Laman had deceived him and did not intend for them to live in peace, but intended for the Lamanites to exploit the Nephites and take, by force, the goods they produced. At first the Lamanite aggressions are limited to small pillaging raids, but they eventually instigate a major battle. Zeniff equips his people with weapons and they enter the battle with Zeniff leading the front line. Zeniff and his people go into battle praying for "deliverance" from their enemies, and emerge victorious. He attributes the Nephites' success in battle to their faith in God.

Another ten years of watchful peace follow until the death of King Laman, when Laman's son and successor again tries to drive the Nephites out of their land. The land of Shilom is adjacent to the land of Nephi-Lehi, but its location leaves Shilom open to enemy attacks on both the north and south sides. Despite this disadvantage, Zeniff prepares his people, sending the women and children into the wilderness and arming all of his men, young and old, for battle. They once again defeat the Lamanites. In his record, Zeniff explains the second war from the perspective of the Lamanites and claims they "have been deceived by the traditions of their fathers." After a reign of about forty years, Zeniff grows old and confers the kingdom to his son, Noah.

== In Mormon Studies ==
=== Perception of Lamanites ===
In a commentary, Brant Gardner states that the scrubbed initial plan to retake the land of Nephi by force is one of the Nephites' "rare overtly offensive actions"; elsewhere in the Book of Mormon, Nephites are generally on the defensive in violent interactions with Lamanites. Gardner also presents a possible explanation for Zeniff's declaration that he had seen "much good" in the Lamanites. He argues that Zeniff would have needed sufficient evidence of his claim to convince a majority of the Nephite army to fight with him. Gardner proposes that Zeniff may have believed the "foundational promise of the Nephites"—in which God promised prosperity in return for those who keep his commandments—to be equally true in application to the Lamanites. With this belief, Gardner argues Zeniff may have considered the Lamanites' wealth and power to constitute evidence of virtue.

In Understanding the Book of Mormon: A Reader's Guide, Grant Hardy points out Zeniff's desire to negotiate a treaty of peace with the Lamanites, as opposed to fighting them for their land. Hardy contrasts Zeniff's good opinion of the Lamanites with Enos and Jarom's, who "found nothing of value in Lamanite culture." Hardy also addresses Zeniff's inclusion of the exact death count of the first war (3,043), which included the Lamanites. Hardy suggests that Zeniff's "careful counting" shows his "concern for his enemies as individuals". He then posits that Zeniff's shift in opinion of the Lamanite people from "good" to "lazy" and "idolatrous" suggests that "the man of peace has become a man of war", evidenced further by Zeniff's neglect to count the dead after the second war. In The Annotated Book of Mormon, Hardy reasons that Zeniff is humanizing the Lamanites when he explains their beliefs and motives before the battle.

=== Lamanite racialization ===
In Make Yourselves Gods: Mormons and the Unfinished Business of American Secularism, Peter Coviello uses Zeniff's account to expand on ideas of Lamanite racialization in the Book of Mormon. Coviello states that Zeniff's acknowledgement of Lamanite motivations "offers an account not of Lamanite wickedness but of Lamanite grievance: of a people precipitated into sustained warfare by a sense of usurpation, harm, and lasting injustice." Coviello proposes that in Zeniff's account, the Lamanites express their view of the Nephites as "persecutors who use the idea of bloodlines, of inherited sins, to authorize their depredations", which Coviello states is an insight into the Nephite's "racialization of righteousness".

== Lineage ==
Lineage of Zeniff

Zeniff	(unnamed)
King Noah	(unnamed)
Limhi

== See also ==
- List of Book of Mormon people
- Zeniff, Arizona

== Works cited ==
- Coviello, Peter (2019). "The Lamanite's Lament; Or, A Brief Reading of the Book of Mormon". Make Yourselves Gods: Mormons and the Unfinished Business of American Secularism. University of Chicago Press. pp. 140–146. ISBN 978-0-226-47433-5.
- Gardner, Brant (2007). Second Witness. Volume 3 Enos—Mosiah. Vol. 3. Greg Kofford Books. ISBN 978-1-58958-043-5. Wikidata Q123118236.
- Hardy, Grant, ed. (2023). The Annotated Book of Mormon. Oxford University Press. ISBN 978-0-19-008220-8. OL 46783409M. Wikidata Q122259222.
- Hardy, Grant (2010). Understanding the Book of Mormon: A Reader's Guide. Oxford University Press. pp. 125–130. ISBN 978-0-19-973170-1. OL 24418834M. Wikidata Q123382112.
- Largey, Dennis L. (2003). "Zeniff". In Largey, Dennis L.; Arnold, Marilyn; Ball, Terry B.; Dahl, Larry E.; Parry, Donald W.; Seely, David R.; Williams, Clyde J. (eds.). Book of Mormon Reference Companion. Deseret Book Company. pp. 802–803. ISBN 1-57345-231-9. Wikidata Q123364479.
- Thomas, John Christopher (2016). A Pentecostal Reads the Book of Mormon: A Literary and Theological Introduction. CPT Press. ISBN 978-1-935931-55-3. Wikidata Q123196681.
