= King Benjamin =

Book of Mormon king of the Nephites

In the Book of Mormon, King Benjamin, son of King Mosiah I, is the second and penultimate Nephite king to rule over Zarahemla. He is considered a king and a prophet and acts as both a spiritual and governmental leader. He is most associated with his speech to the people in the second chapter of the Book of Mosiah, which idealizes the life of a yeoman farmer.

== Synopsis ==
Benjamin is the son of King Mosiah I, a Nephite king who reigned in the land of Zarahemla and whom Benjamin succeeds, going on to lead the Nephites as both a king and a prophet. After becoming king, Benjamin received the Small Plates of Nephi from Amaleki, a Nephite record keeper and the last person to write in the small plates. With no descendants, Amaleki gave the small plates to King Benjamin, who believed Amaleki to be "a just man before the Lord". Near the end of his life, Benjamin gives a speech handing over the position of king to his son King Mosiah II, who would be the final Nephite king.

== Textual history ==
In the printer's manuscript and 1830 edition of the Book of Mormon, the text of Mosiah 21:28 details explorer Ammon telling King Limhi that King Benjamin has a gift for the miraculous translation of texts, while Ether 4:1 narrates the Prophet Mormon noting that King Benjamin kept Jaredite records, specifically the Brother of Jared's writings, in his personal possession. However, in the 1837 edition of the Book of Mormon, Mosiah 21:28 has been emended (probably by Joseph Smith himself) to read that Mosiah is the one with the miraculous gift of translation. Similarly, for the 1849 Latter-day Saint edition, apostle Orson Pratt edited Ether 4:1 to also replace Benjamin with Mosiah as being the one with the Jaredite records. The Reorganized Church of Jesus Christ of Latter Day Saints' (now known as the Community of Christ) 1908 and 1953 editions of the Book of Mormon leave the name Benjamin in Ether 4:1 but include a parenthetical (Mosiah?) to suggest the text might be supposed to read Mosiah instead of Benjamin.

== Interpretations ==
=== Speech ===
Donald Parry writes that Benjamin's speech is "one of the most influential sermons" from the Book of Mormon. In his speech, Benjamin urges his audience to accept communal responsibility for collective material wellbeing. G. St. John Stott compares Benjamin's economic ideal to the "by 1830... old-fashioned" agricultural "yeoman dream, in which economic independence and a modest standard of living defined one's ambition". Benjamin lives by his own manual labor and doesn't try to accumulate wealth.

=== Textual emendations ===
The edits to Mosiah 21:28 and Ether 4:1 likely happened because of uncertainty about the timeline of events in the Book of Mormon. After King Benjamin passes the throne on to his son King Mosiah II, the Prophet Mormon records that Benjamin lived for three more years before dying; Mormon then subsequently narrates the departure of Ammon's expedition, suggesting that Benjamin has already died prior to Ammon's departure, thus prompting the 1837 emendation for Ammon to instead refer to King Mosiah II, who is still alive. Additionally, after meeting Ammon during his expedition, King Limhi brings back twenty-four Jaredite plates to Zarahemla to be translated by King Mosiah II; if Ether 4:1 refers to these records, a rendering of Benjamin seems incorrect, as Benjamin was already noted as having died, and the Book of Mormon had earlier narrated that Mosiah received and translated the records, not Benjamin.

Latter-day Saint author Hugh Nibley believed that the Ether 4:1 emendation was "[p]robably not" necessary for coherence, since a viable reading of the Book of Mormon could allow for the three years of King Benjamin's remaining life to have not yet fully elapsed before Ammon's expedition ended, and before King Limhi brings his Jaredite plates to Zarahemla. Nibley also notes that keeping charge of Jaredite records would be consistent with Benjamin's character as a "life-long book-lover". This also allows for Benjamin to be alive at the time of Mosiah 21:28.

Alternatively, Ether 4:1 refers not to King Limhi's twenty-four Jaredite plates, but rather to Jaredite records that King Benjamin already possessed that were entirely different from those that Mosiah received: religious education professors Daniel Sharp and Matthew Bowen argue that the records are explicitly different, as Ether 4:1 describes the writings of the Brother of Jared, whereas the records that Limhi brings to Zarahemla are the writings of Ether. This allows for Benjamin to be dead when Ammon tells Limhi about him, and when Limhi brings the twenty-four Jaredite plates to Zarahemla.

== Citations ==
Preceded by Mosiah I	King of a tribe of the Nephites ?–124 BC	Succeeded by Mosiah II
Preceded by various kings of the Nephites; eventually Nephi	Nephite record keeper of the large plates c. 2nd century BC	Succeeded by Mosiah II
Preceded by Amaleki	Nephite record keeper of the small plates c. 2nd century BC	Succeeded by Mosiah II
