= Book of Mormon characters =

Book of Mormon characters may refer to

- List of Book of Mormon people, people featured in the Book of Mormon
- The Book of Mormon (musical)#Characters and cast members, Characters in The Book of Mormon musical
