= King Mosiah I =

Book of Mormon character

According to the Book of Mormon, Mosiah I (/moʊˈsaɪ.ə, -ˈzaɪ.ə/) was a Nephite prophet who led the Nephites from the land of Nephi to the land of Zarahemla and was later appointed king. He was the father of King Benjamin and the first of two individuals in the Book of Mormon with the name Mosiah. His grandson, Mosiah II, was Benjamin's son and was king of the Nephite nation from about 124 BC to 91 BC.

== Accounts ==
The history of Mosiah I is limited to Amaleki's account in the Book of Omni.

Following a period of "much war and contention between...the Nephites, and the Lamanites", Mosiah^{1} was "warned of the Lord that he should flee out of the land of Nephi, and as many as would hearken unto the voice of the Lord should also depart out of the land with him, into the wilderness". The journey led them to the land of Zarahemla, inhabited by a group of people who had come from Jerusalem at the "time that Zedekiah, king of Judah, was carried away captive into Babylon". The two groups united and appointed Mosiah their king.

Mosiah I also translated engravings found on a stone which gave an account of the Jaredites, another people who had previously inhabited the area.

Preceded by various kings of the Nephites; eventually Nephi	King of the Nephites ?–? BC	Succeeded by King Benjamin
