= Mulek =

Figure in the Book of Mormon

Mulek (/ˈmjuːlɛk/), according to the Book of Mormon, was the only surviving son of Zedekiah, the last King of Judah, after the Babylonian conquest of Jerusalem. The Book of Mormon states that after escaping from Judah, Mulek traveled to the Americas and established a civilization there.

The word Mulekite, after Mulek, is commonly used to refer to his group. It is one of four groups (the others being the Nephites, the Lamanites, and the Jaredites) described in the Book of Mormon as having settled in the ancient Americas, although the name Mulekites does not appear in the Book of Mormon itself.

== Mulek and his nation ==
According to the Book of Mormon, when Jerusalem was destroyed by Babylon, during the reign of Zedekiah, all of the sons of Zedekiah were killed except Mulek. No details of Mulek's escape are provided except that he and his people "journeyed in the wilderness and were brought by the hand of the Lord across the great waters" to the Americas. The people of Mulek established their capital at Zarahemla, north of where Lehi and his people landed.

== Encounter with Jaredites ==
One of the last two surviving Jaredites, Coriantumr, encountered the Mulekites, who he lived with for several months before he died. The text does not say what happened to Ether, the rightful king/prophet, who also walked away from the last battle.

== Encounter with Nephites ==
When the Nephites were commanded to leave their historic homeland of Lehi-Nephi to flee from the Lamanites, the exiled remnants discovered the city of Zarahemla, to their north. The Book of Mormon records that the Mulekites spoke a language that was largely unintelligible to the Nephites. When taught the Nephite language, the Mulekites recounted their descent from Mulek, which was then recorded.

The Mulekites had in their possession a stone that told the story of Coriantumr, a survivor of the Jaredites who had encountered the Mulekites and lived among them until his death. Much of the prior Mulekite history was lost because of their lack of records.
