= Zarahemla =

Nephite capital in the Book of Mormon

- Nephite capital in the Book of Mormon
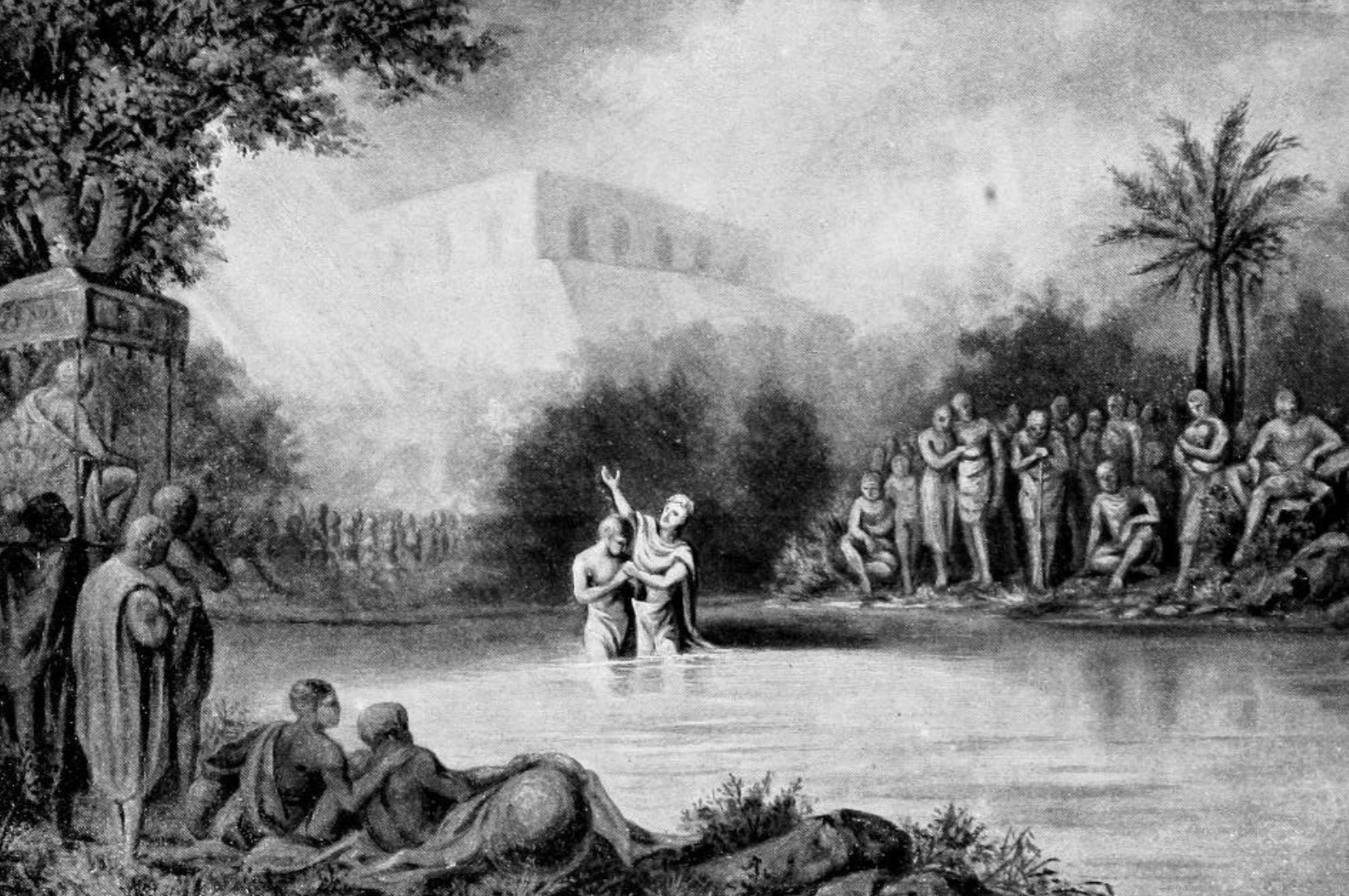
- Baptism of Limhi by George M. Ottinger (1888). Zarahemla is visible in the background.
- Named for: Zarahemla (ruler)

Zarahemla (/ˌzærəˈhɛmlə/) is a land in the Book of Mormon that for much of the narrative functions as the capital of the Nephites, their political and religious center. Zarahemla has been the namesake of multiple communities in the United States, has been alluded to in literature that references Mormonism, and has been portrayed in artwork depicting Book of Mormon content.

Most adherents of the Latter Day Saint movement regard the Book of Mormon as a translation of a genuinely historical text from the ancient Americas (a belief that mainstream academic archaeology does not corroborate). Some adherents have speculated about where Zarahemla would have been located or attempted to find archaeological evidence of it. Such attempts have been unsuccessful.

Zarahemla is described as being near the mouth of a prominent river which the Book of Mormon calls the Sidon River and this river is described as flowing northward into the sea. The book further describes Zarahemla as being south of the Land of Bountiful and immediately south of a "narrow neck of land" that separates the southern land (which includes Zarahemla) from a northern land. Zarahemla is described as being north of the Land of Nephi and the Land of Nephi is described as being north of the Land of First Inheritance. Narrow "strips of wilderness" are described as surrounding Zarahemla on the west, east and south of the River Sidon. The Book of Mormon claims Zarahemla has significant ore deposits full of gold, silver, and copper.

== Background ==
The Book of Mormon, published in 1830, is one of the central scriptures of Mormonism, also called the Latter Day Saint movement. Founder Joseph Smith said that an angel of God directed him to uncover metal plates inscribed with the history of a Christian people in the ancient Americas and that by miraculous means he translated them, producing the Book of Mormon. Most in the Latter Day Saint movement regard the Book of Mormon as being genuinely ancient and historical. Mainstream academic archaeology considers Book of Mormon historicity implausible and unproven.

== Setting ==
In the Book of Mormon, the "land of Zarahemla" is populated by the "people of Zarahemla", so called for Zarahemla, their ruler at the time of the Nephites' encounter with them. (Note: Readers have often called this people the "Mulekites", after the name of Zarahemla's ancestor, though the term is not original to the Book of Mormon.) Zarahemla is identified as a descendant of Mulek, who according to the Book of Mormon is a son of the biblical king Zedekiah. (Note: Mulek himself is an extrabiblical figure.) 350 years earlier, around the same time as the Nephites' ancestor Lehi's flight from Jerusalem, Mulek had led a group from Jerusalem, guided by God, to the same new continent as the Nephites.

When the Nephite king Mosiah (Note: The grandfather of the more well known King Mosiah.) leads a group of Nephite refugees, in response to divine direction, out from the land of Nephi and into the land of Zarahemla, encountering the people of Zarahemla, they and the Nephites unite their societies, and Mosiah becomes king of them all. Zarahemla becomes the second capital city of the Nephites. Literary scholar Jared Hickman calls it "the Nephite home base for the rest of the narrative" after the Nephites migrate there. The Nephites who remain in the land of Nephi, rather than follow Mosiah to the land of Zarahemla, never reappear in the Book of Mormon, and the land of Nephi becomes Lamanite territory.

A temple features in the narrative as the apparent geographic, ceremonial, and societal center of Zarahemla.

== Narrative ==
When the Nephite king Mosiah leads Nephite refugees, in response to divine direction, out from the land of Nephi, they encounter a city inhabited by a people called the "people of Zarahemla", the name of their ruler, in a place called the "land of Zarahemla". Zarahemla is identified as a descendant of Mulek, narrated to be a son of the biblical king Zedekiah; Mulek

According to the Book of Mormon, the Nephite Mosiah and his followers "discovered that the people of Zarahemla came out from Jerusalem at the time that Zedekiah king of Judah, was carried away captive into Babylon" (about 587 B.C.). The people descended from a group led by Mulek, a son of the biblical king Zedekiah, who left Jerusalem at the time of the Babylonian conquest and also crossed the ocean and arrived at the same continent as the party led by Lehi. The book of Omni in the Book of Mormon tells how Zarahemla and his people came to settle the land of Zarahemla in the New World. Mosiah and his refugee people presumably united with the people of Zarahemla sometime between 279 and 130 B.C. "Mosiah was appointed to be their king." Mosiah thereafter presided in the land of Zarahemla over a people called collectively "the Nephites". The Land of Zarahemla was the Nephite capital for many years.

Notable Book of Mormon descendants of the leader Zarahemla include Ammon the venturer and Coriantumr the dissenter. Ammon led a quest in search of a colony that had left the land of Zarahemla in order to resettle a city named Lehi-Nephi. The dissenter Coriantumr led the Lamanites in battle against the Nephites in the first century B.C.

At some point before Mosiah discovered Zarahemla, the people of Zarahemla had discovered Coriantumr (not to be confused with the later Nephite dissenter of the same name). According to the Book of Mormon, Coriantumr was the last of a destroyed nation called the Jaredites. Coriantumr stayed with the people of Zarahemla "for the space of nine moons" (Omni 1:21) before dying and being buried by them (Omni 13:21).

Benjamin succeeded his father Mosiah as the second Nephite king of Zarahemla. King Benjamin was victorious in driving Lamanites enemies from the Zarahemla region.

At the time of the crucifixion of Christ, the Book of Mormon records that "there were exceedingly sharp lightnings, such as never had been known in all the land. And the city of Zarahemla did take fire." "And it came to pass that there was a voice heard among all the inhabitants of the earth ... 'because of their iniquity and abominations ... that great city Zarahemla have I burned with fire, and the inhabitants thereof ... I am Jesus Christ, the Son of God.'" (3 Nephi, 9: 1, 2, 3, 15.) The Book of Mormon indicates that "the great city of Zarahemla" was rebuilt sometime in the first century A.D. As his doomed nation retreated northward from their enemies, the 4th century prophet and historian Mormon recorded that Nephite "towns, and villages, and cities were burned with fire." The Book of Mormon does not indicate whether the city of Zarahemla survived to be occupied by Lamanites after the destruction of the Nephite nation.

== Cultural reception ==
=== Namesakes ===
In 1841, Joseph Smith dictated a revelation instructing Latter-day Saints in Iowa to establish a city across the Mississippi River from Nauvoo, Illinois and name it after Zarahemla. A settlement of Latter-day Saints, located across the Mississippi River from Nauvoo and south of Montrose, Iowa, was called Zarahemla. The Zarahemla Stake (Note: Among Latter-day Saints, a stake is a regional unit of ecclesiastical organization which oversees several local units, or congregations (known as wards).) in Iowa was abandoned in 1842. In the nineteenth century, Blanchardville, Wisconsin was called Zarahemla. In 1850, under the direction of Zenas H. Gurley, Latter Day Saints who lived there and were unaffiliated with Brigham Young's Church of Jesus Christ of Latter-day Saints organized into the Yellowstone Branch. Zarahemla was the location of the Reorganization's first or second conference, held in 1853. The congregation at Zarahemla dissolved in 1860.

Zarahemla, Utah is named after the city from the Book of Mormon. The second book in author Gary Stewart's Gabe Utley detective series, published in 1986, is titled The Zarahemla Vision. Its narrative is set in Salt Lake City and involves the apparent kidnapping of the LDS Church president. As part of appropriating Mormon themes of revelation and ideas about indigenous resurgence, Kanaka Maoli author Matthew Kaopio's 2005 novel Written in the Sky invokes the name Zarahemla to allude to the Book of Mormon. One of the novel's characters, Dr. Owlfeathers, is from the nonexistent Zarahemla University.

=== Speculating locations ===
Responding to their belief in the Book of Mormon's ancient historicity, Latter-day Saints throughout the nineteenth century believed archaeological evidence would emerge to corroborate the Book of Mormon; many regarded scholarship on the ancient Americas as vindication of the book. There has been no actual archaeological discovery of Zarahemla.

In 1842, Latter-day Saint newspaper the Times and Seasons associated Zarahemla with the ruins of Quiriguá. Artist George M. Ottinger opined that the Maya city-state Palenque was one and the same as Zarahemla. In an elaborate geography constructed from the Book of Mormon's text, Latter-day Saints George Reynolds and Janne M. Sjödahl supposed Zarahemla was located along the Magdalena River in Colombia. Classically trained, Sjödahl followed the "signature style of biblical archaeology", in the words of religious studies scholar Matthew Bowman, trying to corroborate Book of Mormon text with archaeological data, to draw his conclusions for associating Zarahemla with the Maya. In a retrospective on Book of Mormon historicity apologetics, Brant Gardner states that anthropological evidence indicates that "any facile equation of the Nephites with the Maya (or claim that the Nephites influenced the Maya) cannot work".

Benjamin Cluff, then president of Brigham Young Academy, from 1900 to 1901 led an expedition, mostly comprising students, to try to discover evidence of the city of Zarahemla in Colombia, in accord with Reynolds and Sjödahl's proposed geography. Six of the group reached the Magdalena, but they turned back after learning that civil conflict had destabilized the region, ending their expedition.

Margarito Bautista in his 1936 La evolución de Mexico: sus verdaderos progenitores y su origen: el destino de America y Europa expressed his belief that Book of Mormon peoples were the ancestors of indigenous Mexicans, and he superimposed Zarahemla onto the region north of Panama, somewhere in Guatemala, Honduras, or southern Mexico.

In 2021, a group of Mormons called the Heartland Research Group believed they had found the location of Zarahemla outside Montrose, Iowa and searched the soil for evidence of human habitation using lidar. They also took core samples with the aim of using carbon dating to identify evidence of fires. The Heartland Research Group holds to what has been called the "Heartland model", a belief among certain Mormons that the events of the Book of Mormon took place specifically in the Heartland of the United States, the emergence of which coincided with growth in LDS Church membership in Central and South America. Religion Dispatches reports that the Heartland model movement rests on American nationalism and espouses white supremacy and Euro-American colonialism.

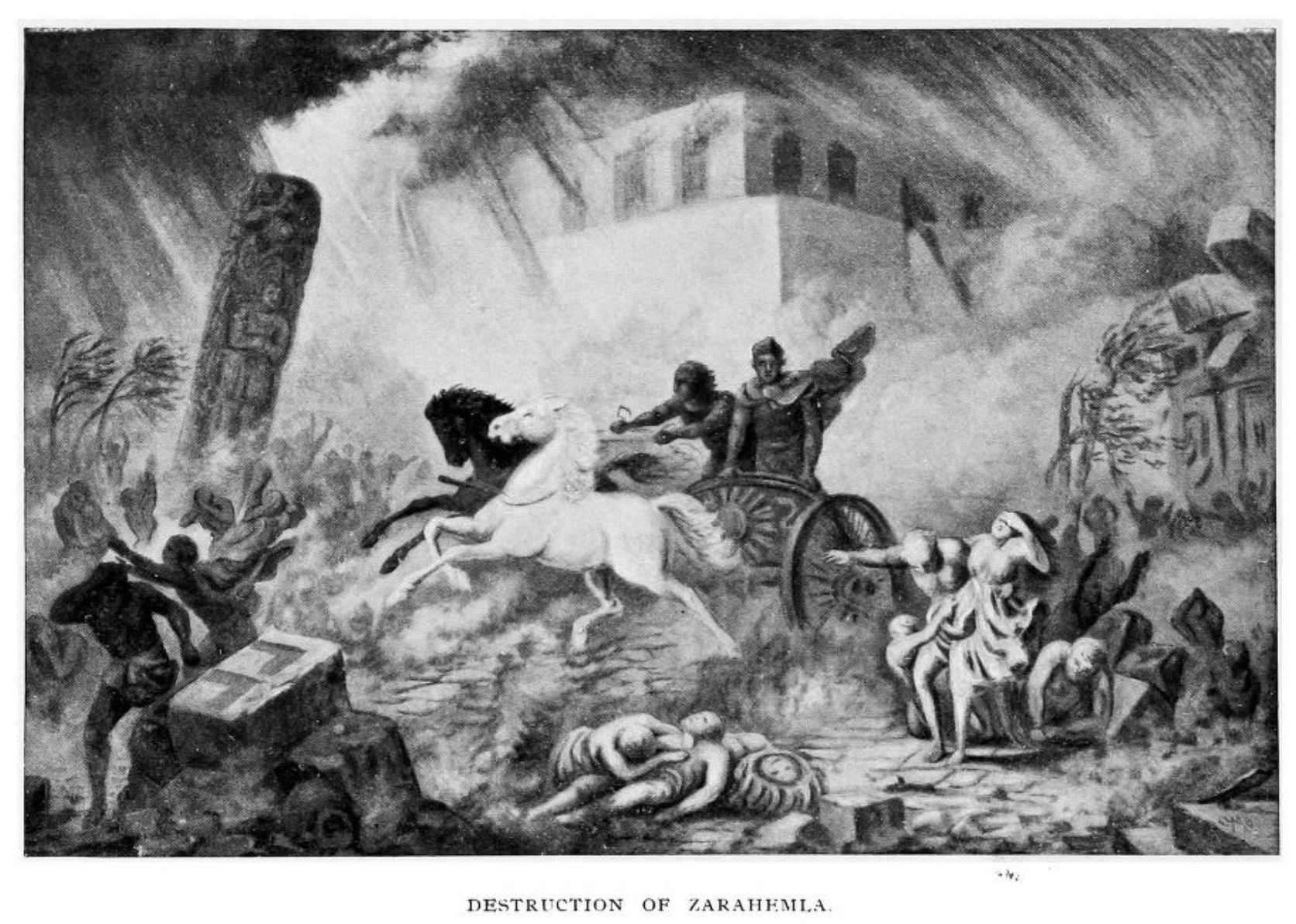
Destruction of Zarahemla (1888) by George M. Ottinger

=== Visual art ===
George M. Ottinger's oil painting Destruction of Zarahemla took cues for its composition from Benjamin West's Death on a Pale Horse and for its visualization of Zarahemla from archaeological illustrations, including a Maya stelae resembling one from Quiriguála. The horses, chariot, clouds, and fleeing crowd also resemble those of Nicolas Poussin's paintings The Conversion of St. Paul and The Death of Hippolytus. It was published in December 1888 as an illustration in The Story of the Book of Mormon.

== Sources ==
- Alexander, Thomas G.; Bitton, Davis (2019). Historical Dictionary of the Latter-day Saints. Historical Dictionaries of Religions, Philosophies, and Movements (4th ed.). Rowman and Littlefield. ISBN 978-1-5381-2071-2.
- Amos, Kelsey (2016). "Hawaiian Futurism: Written in the Sky and Up Among the Stars". Extrapolation. 57 (1–2): 197–220. doi:10.3828/extr.2016.11.
- Austin, Michael (2024). The Testimony of Two Nations: How the Book of Mormon Reads, and Rereads, the Bible. University of Illinois Press. ISBN 9780252045356.
- Barlow, Philip L. (2004). "Space Matters: A Geographical Context for the Reorganization's Great Transformation". John Whitmer Historical Association Journal. 24: 21–39. JSTOR 43201043.
- Bingman, Margaret (1978). Encyclopedia of the Book of Mormon. Herald Publishing House. ISBN 0-8309-0199-X.
- Brady, Margaret K. (Fall 1987). "The Zarahemla Vision. By Gary Stewart". Western American Literature. 22 (3): 238–239. doi:10.1353/wal.1987.0098.
- Bowman, Matthew (2021). "Biblical Criticism, the Book of Mormon, and the Meanings of Civilization". Journal of Book of Mormon Studies. 30: 62–89. ISSN 2374-4766. JSTOR 10.5406/jbookmormstud2.30.2021.0062.
- Bushman, Richard Lyman (2008). Mormonism: A Very Short Introduction. Very Short Introductions. Oxford University Press. doi:10.1093/actrade/9780195310306.001.0001. ISBN 978-0-19-531030-6.
- Carmack, Noel A. (2008). "'A Picturesque and Dramatic History': George Reynolds's Story of the Book of Mormon". Brigham Young University Studies. 47 (2): 115–141. ISSN 0007-0106. JSTOR 43044637.
- Dunstan, Adam; Hawvermale, Erica (2022). "The Anthropology of Mormonism: An Emerging Field" (PDF). Journal of the Mormon Social Science Association. 1: 177–207. doi:10.54587/JMSSA.0107.
- Eliason, Eric A. (2023). "Nameways in Latter-day Saint History, Custom, and Folklore". In Oaks, Dallin D.; Baltes, Paul; Minson, Kent (eds.). Perspectives on Latter-day Saint Names and Naming: Names, Identity, and Belief. Routledge. pp. 70–100. doi:10.4324/9781003325000-5. ISBN 9781000850451.
- Gardner, Brant A. (2021). "A Personal Perspective on Book of Mormon Historicity and Apologetics". Journal of Book of Mormon Studies. 30: 142–164. ISSN 2374-4766. JSTOR 10.5406/jbookmormstud2.30.2021.0142.
- Givens, Terryl L. (2002). By the Hand of Mormon: The American Scripture that Launched a New World Religion. Oxford University Press. doi:10.1093/019513818X.001.0001. ISBN 9780195138184.
- Givens, Terryl L. (2009). "The Book of Mormon". In Marcus, Greil; Sollors, Werner (eds.). A New Literary History of America. Belknap Press of Harvard University Press. pp. 192–196. doi:10.2307/j.ctv1msswhj.44. ISBN 978-0-674-0-3594-2. JSTOR j.ctv1msswhj.44.
- Hardy, Grant (2010). Understanding the Book of Mormon: A Reader's Guide. Oxford University Press. ISBN 9780199745449.
- Hardy, Grant, ed. (2023). The Annotated Book of Mormon. Oxford University Press. ISBN 9780190082222.
- Hickman, Jared (2022). "The Book of Mormon as Amerindian Apocalypse". In Townsend, Colby (ed.). Envisioning Scripture: Joseph Smith's Revelations in Their Early American Contexts. Signature Books. pp. 269–302. ISBN 978-1-56085-447-0.
- Ishikawa, Nancy Hiles (1979). "Alice Smith Edwards: The Little Princess". Journal of Mormon History. 6: 61–74. JSTOR 23286016.
- Jones, Glen Nelson (January 2016). "Search for Zarahemla, 1900: Expeditioneer Parley Pratt Nelson". Journal of Mormon History. 42 (1): 199–238. doi:10.5406/jmormhist.42.1.0199. JSTOR 10.5406/jmormhist.42.1.0199.
- Kahlert, Robert Christian (2016). Salvation and Solvency: The Socio-economic Policies of Early Mormonism. Arbeiten zur Kirchengeschichte. Vol. 133. De Gruyter. doi:10.1515/9783110473476. ISBN 9783110470208.
- Kelty, Daniel M. (Fall–Winter 2011). "The History of Zarahemla (Blanchardville): Headquarters of the Reorganization, 1852–60". John Whitmer Historical Association Journal. 31 (2): 88–102. JSTOR 43200527.
- Kimball, Stanley B. (Winter 1978). "Nauvoo West: The Mormons of the Iowa Shore". Brigham Young University Studies. 18 (2): 132–142. JSTOR 43040752.
- Mason, Patrick Q. (September 3, 2015). Barton, John (ed.). "Mormonism". Oxford Research Encyclopedia of Religion. doi:10.1093/acrefore/9780199340378.013.75. ISBN 978-0-19-934037-8.
- Nash, Paul D. (2017). Slavery and Silence: Latin America and the U. S. Slave Debate. University of Pennsylvania Press. doi:10.9783/9780812294309. ISBN 9780812294309.
- Noyce, David (December 9, 2021). "Latest from Mormon Land: Iowa John and the Next Crusade—Searching for Zarahemla". Salt Lake Tribune.
- Pulido, Elisa Eastwood (2020). The Spiritual Evolution of Margarito Bautista: Mexican Mormon Evangelizer, Polygamist Dissident, and Utopian Founder, 1878–1961. Oxford University Press. doi:10.1093/oso/9780190942106.001.0001. ISBN 9780190942106.
- Ricks, Stephen D. (2012). "'Build a House to My Name': The Idea of the Temple in Mormon History". In Cusack, Carole; Norman, Alex (eds.). Handbook of New Religions and Cultural Production. Brill Handbooks on Contemporary Religion. Brill. pp. 17–37. doi:10.1163/9789004226487_003. ISBN 978-90-04-22187-1.
- Robertson, Breanne (Spring 2022). "Poster Children of the Sun: George M. Ottinger's Mesoamerican History Paintings and Latter-day Saint Identity in the U. S.–Mexico Borderlands". American Art. 36 (1): 1–29. doi:10.1086/719437.
- Rushing, Ty (December 6, 2021). "Archeological Search Underway in SE Iowa for Ancient Mormon City". Iowa Starting Line.
- Seriac, Hannah (December 15, 2021). "Mormon Group Digging for Scriptural City of Zarahemla in Iowa Is a Portrait of Religious Nationalism". Religion Dispatches.
- Sorensen, John L. (1992). "Book of Mormon Peoples". In Ludlow, Daniel H. (ed.). Encyclopedia of Mormonism. Macmillan. pp. 191–195. ISBN 0028796055.
- Stoker, Hendrik G.; Derengowski, Paul (2018). "Joseph Smith's Plain and Precious Truths Restored". In die Skriflig. 52 (3). a2352. doi:10.4102/ids.v52i3.2352. ISSN 1018-6441.
- Vicarel, Jo An (July 1986). "Stewart, Gary. The Zarahemla Vision". Library Journal. 111 (12): 114. ISSN 0363-0277.
- Vogel, Dan (1986). Indian Origins and the Book of Mormon. Signature Books. ISBN 0-941214-42-7.
- Woods, Fred E. (2003). "Scripture Note: Doctrine and Covenants 125". Religious Educator. 4 (1): 87–88.
