= Nephites =

People mentioned in the Book of Mormon

In the Book of Mormon, the Nephites (/ˈniːfaɪts/) are one of four groups (along with the Lamanites, Jaredites, and Mulekites) said to have settled in the ancient Americas. The term is used throughout the Book of Mormon to describe the religious, political, and cultural traditions of the group of settlers.

The Nephites are described as a group of people that descended from or were associated with Nephi, a son of the prophet Lehi, who left Jerusalem at the urging of God in about 600 BC and traveled with his family to the Western Hemisphere and arrived to the present-day Americas in about 589 BC. The Book of Mormon notes them as initially righteous people who eventually "had fallen into a state of unbelief and awful wickedness" and were destroyed by the Lamanites in about AD 385.

Some Mormon scholars have suggested that the Nephites settled somewhere in present-day Central America. However, non-Mormon scholars and, notably, the Smithsonian Institution, have stated that they have seen no evidence to support the Book of Mormon as a historical account.

== Archaeology ==
The existence of the Nephites is part of the Mormon belief system.

The Foundation for Ancient Research and Mormon Studies (FARMS), part of Brigham Young University, has performed extensive archaeological research on this subject, and publications on the subject and other historical topics are issued regularly by FARMS. This research is disputed by many researchers, including Michael Coe, a scholar in pre-Columbian Mesoamerican history, as well as the Smithsonian Institution.

In 1973, Coe addressed the issue in an article for Dialogue: A Journal of Mormon Thought:

Mormon archaeologists over the years have almost unanimously accepted the Book of Mormon as an accurate, historical account of the New World peoples. ... Let me now state uncategorically that as far as I know there is not one professionally trained archaeologist, who is not a Mormon, who sees any scientific justification for believing the foregoing to be true, and I would like to state that there are quite a few Mormon archaeologists who join this group. ... The bare facts of the matter are that nothing, absolutely nothing, has even shown up in any New World excavation which would suggest to a dispassionate observer that the Book of Mormon, as claimed by Joseph Smith, is a historical document relating to the history of early migrants to our hemisphere.

In 1996, the Smithsonian Institution issued a statement that addressed claims made in the Book of Mormon by stating that the text is primarily a religious text and that archeologists affiliated with the Institution found "no direct connection between the archeology of the New World and the subject matter of the book." The statement further says that there is genetic evidence that the Native Americans are closely related to peoples of Asia and that archaeological evidence indicates that the Native Americans migrated from Asia over a land bridge over the Bering Strait in prehistoric times. The statement said that there was no credible evidence of contact between Ancient Egyptian or Hebrew peoples and the New World, as indicated by the text of the Book of Mormon. The statement was issued in response to reports that the name of the Smithsonian Institution was being improperly used to lend credibility to the claims of those looking to support the events of the Book of Mormon. The National Geographic Society issued a similar letter in response to an inquiry from the Institute for Religious Research saying that "the Society does not know of anything found so far that has substantiated The Book of Mormon".

== Book of Mormon narrative ==
=== Kings ===
After the Nephites arrived in America, up to the reign of Mosiah II (c. 592–91 BC), the Nephites were ruled by kings. Nephi's brother Jacob explains that subsequent kings bore the title "Nephi".

The people having loved Nephi exceedingly… were desirous to retain in remembrance his name. And whoso should reign in his stead were called by the people second Nephi, third Nephi, and so forth, according to the reigns of the kings; and thus they were called by the people, let them be of whatever name they would.

— Jacob 1:10–11

=== Judges ===
The last Nephite king was Mosiah II. About 91 BC, he declared that, instead of naming a new king, he would finish out his reign as king, after which the Nephites would elect judges to govern them. There were at least three levels of judges: one chief judge, several higher judges, and several lower judges. (Some passages speak of multiple "chief judges", probably synonymous with "higher judges"; for example, Alma 62:47; 3 Nephi 6:21.)

Judges were paid according to the amount of time they spent officiating. Mosiah II set the rate at one senine of gold (or the equivalent senum of silver) for one day's work (Alma 11:1, 3). He also arranged for checks in this system to avert corruption as much as possible:

And now if ye have judges, and they do not judge you according to the law which has been given, ye can cause that they may be judged of a higher judge. If your higher judges do not judge righteous judgments, ye shall cause that a small number of your lower judges should be gathered together, and they shall judge your higher judges, according to the voice of the people.

— Mosiah 29:28–29

After announcing the governmental shift from kings to judges, Mosiah explained the principle behind the change:

The sins of many people have been caused by the iniquities of their kings.... Now it is not common that the voice of the people desireth anything contrary to that which is right; but it is common for the lesser part of the people to desire that which is not right; therefore this shall ye observe and make it your law—to do your business by the voice of the people.

— Mosiah 29:31, 26

The system of judges lasted for 120 years, when it was briefly overthrown for about three years (c. 30–33 AD) by an aristocratic cadre, led by a man named Jacob. It was replaced by a loose system of tribes and kinships, which lasted until Jesus appeared in America and established a society that approached the ideals of Zion. The society endured for about two centuries before the people fell into wickedness again.

After 4 Nephi, no mention is made of whether the Nephites used judges or kings. Mormon mentions that "the Lamanites had a king" (Mormon 2:9). His inclusion of that detail, phrased as it is, can be seen as a contrast to the Nephites having a chief judge. Since no change in government form is specifically mentioned after 4 Nephi, it is possible that the Nephites continued to use judges until their destruction in about AD 385.

== See also ==
- Genetic history of indigenous peoples of the Americas
- Historicity of the Book of Mormon
- Linguistics and the Book of Mormon
- Three Nephites

== General sources ==
- Fowles, John L. (1992). "The Decline of the Nephites: Rejection of the Covenant and Word of God". In Nyman, Monte S.; Tate, Charles D. Jr. (eds.). The Book of Mormon: Helaman Through 3 Nephi 8, According to Thy Word. Provo, Utah: Religious Studies Center, Brigham Young University. pp. 81–92. ISBN 0-8849-4864-1. Archived from the original on 2014-05-21.
- Turner, Rodney (1988). "The Three Nephite Churches of Christ". In Cheesman, Paul R. (ed.). The Book of Mormon: The Keystone Scripture. Provo, Utah: Religious Studies Center, Brigham Young University. pp. 91–99. ISBN 0-8849-4637-1.
