= List of people in the Book of Mormon =

This list is intended as a compendium of individuals mentioned in the Book of Mormon.

== Notation ==
Names with superscripts (e.g., Nephi^{1}) are generally numbered according to the index in the LDS scripture, the Book of Mormon (with minor changes). Missing indices indicate people in the index who are not in the Book of Mormon; for instance, Aaron^{1} is the biblical Aaron, brother of Moses.

- **Bold type** indicates the person was an important religious figure, such as a prophet or a missionary.
- Italic type indicates the person was a king, chief judge or other ruler.
- Underlined type indicates the person was a historian or record keeper; one whose writing (abridged or not) is included in The Book of Mormon.
- Combined typefaces indicate combined roles. For example, **bold italic** indicates an individual was both a religious and secular leader.

== A ==
- Aaron^{2}, son or descendant of Jaredite king Heth^{2}, in line of kingly succession, who spent his life in captivity. Father of Amnigaddah.
- **Aaron^{3}**, Nephite and formerly rebellious second son of Mosiah^{2}, who after conversion refused the throne and became successful missionary. Cast into prison in Middoni, delivered by Lamoni and Ammon^{3}. Instrumental in converting father of Lamoni. Brother to Ammon^{3}, Omner, and Himni (c. 92 BC).
- Aaron^{4}, Lamanite king who attacked Mormon^{2} with a larger army, but lost (c. AD 330).
- **Abinadi**, Nephite prophet sent to people of Lehi-Nephi. Instrumental in conversion of Alma^{1}. Prophesied to Noah^{3}, then was burned to death (c. 150 BC).
- Abinadom, Nephite historian and warrior who knew of neither revelation nor prophecy. Son of Chemish and father of Amaleki^{1} (c. 3rd century BC).
- Abish, Lamanite woman converted following her father's vision, and a servant of Lamoni's wife. One of only three named women unique to the Book of Mormon, along with Sariah and Isabel.
- Aha, Nephite military officer and son of Zoram^{2} who went into Lamanite territory to recover captives (c. 80 BC).
- Ahah, an iniquitous Jaredite king who led a short life. Son of Seth^{2}, and father or ancestor of Ethem.
- Akish, wicked Jaredite son of Kimnor, and erstwhile friend of Omer, who worked in secret combinations. Plotted with Jared^{3} and his daughter to overthrow Omer. Obtained kingdom by slaying Jared^{3}. Jealous of his own son, imprisoned and starved him, which angered another son Nimrah, and initiated a years-long war between Akish and his sons.
- **Alma^{1}**, known as "Alma the Elder". Nephite prophet and former priest of Noah^{3}, converted by Abinadi. After pleading Abinadi's case, was cast out and fled from place to place to escape king's priests. In the wilderness, repented, reestablished church, preached, and baptized 204 souls at the Waters of Mormon. Led many followers, but declined kingship. In Helam, surrendered to Lamanites, oppressed by Noahide priest Amulon, delivered through faith, then fled to Zarahemla where he met Mosiah^{2}. Instrumental in conversion of Limhi (c. 173–91 BC).
- **Alma^{2}**, son of Alma^{1}, known as "Alma the Younger". Nephite prophet and first chief judge. After seeking to destroy Church with sons of Mosiah^{2}, saw an angel who struck them dumb. Converted, he taught the people and was later appointed chief judge and high priest. During reign, sentenced Nehor, led Nephite army, slew Amlici, baptized many, mourned wickedness in the church, and resigned judgment seat to Nephihah. Preached in Gideon, Zarahemla, Melek, and Ammonihah, where he was reviled. Angelic visitation brought him to Amulek, with whom he went out to preach. Accused by Zeezrom and questioned by Antionah. The people, angered, sought his death and that of other believers. Imprisoned with Amulek, where their prayers broke prison walls. Healed Zeezrom, continued preaching, and encountered and confronted antichrist Korihor. Advised Moroni^{2} on military strategy. Father of Helaman^{2}, Shiblon, and Corianton. Continued preaching and prophesying until end of his life (c. 100–73 BC).
- Amaleki^{1}, Nephite record keeper, son of Abinadom, who delivered the plates to King Benjamin (c. 130 BC).
- Amaleki^{2}, Nephite explorer, brother of Ammon^{2}, and a seeker of Zeniff's people (c. 121 BC).
- Amalickiah, Nephite traitor, elder brother of Ammoron, who lead revolt against Helaman^{2}, threatened to drink blood of Moroni^{1}. After poisoning Lehonti and killing king of the Lamanites^{3}, obtained throne and warred with Nephites. Killed by Teancum (c. 70 BC).
- Amaron, Nephite record keeper who saw destruction of "more wicked part" of the Nephites. Brother of Chemish and son of Omni (c. 3rd century BC).
- Aminadab, Nephite dissenter living among Lamanites. Reconverted by Nephi^{2} and Lehi^{4}, whom he testified were conversing with angels (c. 30 BC).
- Amgid (/ˈæmɡɪd/), late Jaredite usurper king, overthrown by Com^{2}.
- Aminadi, who interpreted writing on wall of the temple, written by the finger of God. Descendant of Nephi^{1} and ancestor of Amulek.
- Amlici, Nephite dissenter who became leader of dissenters, and was slain by Alma^{2} in battle (c. 87 BC). Namesake of the Amlicite people.
- Ammah, Nephite missionary, companion of Aaron^{3} and Muloki. Preached at Ani-Anti and Middoni, imprisoned in Middoni, rescued by Ammon^{3}.
- Ammaron, fourth Nephite record keeper after visitation of Christ. Told Mormon^{2} how and when to hide plates. Son of Amos^{2}, brother of Amos^{3} (c. AD 306).
- Ammon^{1}, also called Ben-Ammi, son of the Biblical Lot, the children of whom Isaiah^{1} (as quoted by Jacob^{2}) prophesied will obey the stem of Jesse.
- Ammon^{2}, a Mulekite descendant and leader of a Nephite expedition from Zarahemla to land of Nephi, who lead Limhi and his people to freedom (c. 121 BC).
- **Ammon^{3}**, formerly rebellious son of Mosiah^{2} and brother to Aaron^{3}, Omner, and Himni. After refusing kingship, became a missionary to Lamanites. Converted Lamoni, his wife, and many of his people, none of whom ever fell away. Though attacked by non-believers, could not be slain. In Middoni, freed his brethren from prison, and later helped Anti-Nephi-Lehies migrate to Zarahemla, then to land of Jershon. As high priest over Ammonites, banished the antichrist Korihor. Joined Alma^{2} on mission to Zoramites where they were astonished to discover the Rameumptom (c. 100 BC).
- Ammoron, Nephite traitor, brother of Amalickiah and descendant of Zoram, who engaged in angry correspondence with Moroni^{1}. King of the Lamanites after Amalickiah's death, then killed by Teancum (c. 66–61 BC).
- Amnigaddah, captive Jaredite, in line of kingly succession. Father of Coriantum^{2}, and son of Aaron^{2}.
- Amnor, Nephite spy in Amlicite campaign, along with Limher, Manti, and Zeram (c. 87 BC).
- Amoron, Nephite from fifth century AD. Contemporary and subordinate of the prophet and army commander Mormon^{2} during final war between Lamanites and Nephites (c. AD 380–400).
- Amos^{2}, second Nephite record keeper documenting time of peace following visitation from Christ. Father of Amos^{3} and Ammaron, son of Nephi^{4} (c. AD 110–194).
- Amos^{3}, son of Amos^{2}, third record keeper documenting Nephite history after visitation by Christ. Passed record to brother Ammaron (c. AD 194–306).
- **Amulek**, Nephite son of Giddonah^{1}, grandson of Ishmael^{3}; Amulek was visited by an angel, converted by and later a missionary companion of Alma^{2}, and caused the prison walls to tumble (c. 82–74 BC).
- Amulon, wicked leader of priests of Noah^{3} at time of king Laman^{3}, who was later made king and threatened believers with death.
- Anti-Nephi-Lehi, brother of Lamoni, king over converted Lamanites, who counseled with Ammon^{3}. Namesake of ethnic group the Anti-Nephi-Lehies.
- Antiomno, Lamanite king of land of Middoni and friend to Lamoni, who imprisoned the missionaries Aaron^{3}, Muloki, and Ammah.
- Antionah, chief ruler in Ammonihah who inquired of Alma^{2} about nature of immortality.
- Antionum, Nephite commander lost in final battle at Cumorah (c. AD 385).
- Antipus, Nephite commander in city of Judea who battled Lamanites with Helaman^{2} and stripling warriors (c. 65 BC).
- Archeantus (/ˌɑːrkiˈæntəs/), Nephite soldier, one of three "choice men" slain in battle (c. AD 375).

== B ==
- **Benjamin**, known as King Benjamin, righteous Nephite prophet and king, and father of Mosiah^{2}, Helorum, and Helaman^{1}. Reigned after father, Mosiah^{1}. Drove warring Lamanites from Zarahemla using sword of Laban, received plates from Amaleki^{1}, and established peace. After instructing sons to protect records and conferring kingdom on eldest, addressed people from tower, where he admonished service, industry, and charity to the poor. Taught of Christ (c. 120 BC).
- Brother of Amaleki^{1} (unnamed), and son of Abinadom, who participated in both expeditions to Land of Nephi, along with Zeniff. At least one writer argues that this individual might be same person as the prophet Abinadi.
- Brothers of Amulon (unnamed), perhaps metaphorical brothers (comprising priests of Noah^{3}), who taught language of Nephi^{1} to Lamanites by order of King Laman^{3}.
- **Brother of Jared**^{2}, (also Mahonri Moriancumer), prophet who asked God not to confound language of family and friends (collectively, the Jaredites) at the Tower of Babel, and who moved a mountain. Led by God out of the land, instructed to build several watertight barges, and prayed over how to light them and ensure adequate air. Charged to propose a solution, found stones and asked God to light them. In a theophany, saw the finger of God—the premortal Christ—touch stones to make them shine, and was astonished to see Christ had form and substance. Taken inside veil, received the Urim and Thummim along with additional revelation. Instructed to write the revelations, which were kept under seal until after Christ's future appearance. After dramatic ocean crossing, established self in the land and became father of 22 sons and daughters, including Pagag. Argued unsuccessfully against establishment of a monarchy.
- Brother of Kim (unnamed), unrighteous middle Jaredite who rebelled against Kim and subjected him and his descendants to captivity. Son of Morianton^{1}.
- Brother of Nimrah (unnamed), Jaredite whose father, Akish, imprisoned and starved him to death out of jealousy, sparking a war between Akish and his sons.
- Brother of Shiblom^{1} (and presumably, son of Com^{2}), Jaredite who ordered death of all the prophets.

== C ==
- Captain Moroni, see Moroni^{1}
- Cezoram, eighth Nephite chief judge (c. 30 BC), preceded by Nephi^{2}, son of Helaman, and succeeded by his son, and eventually by Seezoram. (Cezoram and Seezoram are two different people and should not be confused with one another).
- Chemish, Nephite record keeper, son of Omni and brother of Amaron (c. 3rd century BC).
- Cohor^{1}, unrighteous early Jaredite king, son of Corihor^{1} and brother of Noah^{2}. He joined Noah^{2}, with "all his brethren and many of the people" to establish a rival kingdom to Shule's. No further references were made, but he seems to have been influential, as Noah^{2} later named son after him, and name was passed down to end of Jaredite lineage.
- Cohor^{2}, wicked early Jaredite king slain by Shule. Son of Noah^{2}, father of Nimrod^{2}.
- Cohor^{3}, late Jaredite mentioned only as father of fair [tragic] sons and daughters.
- Com^{1} (/koʊm/), righteous middle Jaredite king, son of Coriantum^{1} and father of Heth^{1}; dethroned by his son.
- Com^{2}, righteous late Jaredite king who drew away half to kingdom, then battled against Amgid for remainder of kingdom; fought in vain against robbers. Father of Shiblom^{1} (Shiblon) and at least one other son, son of Coriantum^{2}.
- Corianton (/ˌkɒriˈæntən/), son of Alma^{2} (and younger brother to Helaman^{2} and Shiblon), Nephite missionary after he repented of chasing after the harlot Isabel (c. 74 BC).
- Coriantor, late Jaredite in line of kingship, son of Moron, father or ancestor of Ether. Although his father had been king, Coriantor "dwelt in captivity all his days".
- Coriantum^{1}, righteous middle Jaredite king, a city builder who married in old age. Son of Emer, father of Com^{1}.
- Coriantum^{2}, captive middle Jaredite in line of kingly succession. Father of Com^{2}, son of Amnigaddah.
- Coriantumr^{1}, early Jaredite, son of king Omer and brother of Emer, who restored kingdom to his father.
- Coriantumr^{2}, last Jaredite king and last Jaredite survivor. Fought Shared and warred against Gilead, Lib^{2}, and Shiz. Lived 9 months with people of Zarahemla (c. 130 BC).
- Coriantumr^{3}, Nephite apostate, commander of Lamanite forces, descendant of Zarahemla. Large and mighty man who invaded city of Zarahemla, slew chief judge Pacumeni at city wall, then marched on Bountiful until Moronihah^{1} cut him down (c. 51 BC).
- Corihor^{1}, early Jaredite and rebel son of Kib (and brother to Shule), who later repented of his rebellion. Fathered Noah^{2} and Cohor^{1}, both of whom then rebelled against him.
- Corihor^{2}, late Jaredite mentioned only as father of fair [tragic] sons and daughters. (Not to be confused with the antichrist Korihor.)
- Corom (/ˈkɔːrəm/), middle Jaredite king, who did good for his people and fathered many children, including Kish. Son of Levi^{2}.
- Cumenihah (/ˌkuːməˈnaɪhɑː/), Nephite commander lost in final battle at Cumorah (c. AD 385).

== D ==
- Daughter of Jared^{3} (unnamed), who sought to save her father's kingdom and kill Omer, and who married Akish and conspired with him and others to instigate secret combinations (c. 63 BC).

== E ==
- Emer (/ˈiːmər/), middle Jaredite king who had a peaceful, prosperous reign of 62 years, executed righteous judgment, and saw Jesus Christ. Son of Omer and father of Coriantum^{1}.
- Emron (/ˈɛmrɒn/), Nephite soldier, one of three "choice men" slain in battle (c. AD 375).^{,}
- **Enos^{2}**, son of Jacob^{2}, a Nephite prophet and record keeper, narrator of Book of Enos, who prayed morning to night to receive remission of sins.
- Esrom (/ˈɛzrəm/), early Jaredite, son of Omer and brother to Coriantumr^{1}, who fought their brother Jared^{3} to return kingdom to his father.
- Ethem, wicked later Jaredite king whose people hardened their hearts. Son or descendant of Ahah, father of Moron.
- **Ether**, influential and final Jaredite prophet. Descendant of Coriantor and namesake of Book of Ether. Made his record on 24 gold plates. Prophesied at time of Coriantumr^{2} but was rejected. Hid in cave from which he viewed final destruction of Jaredites, after which, finished and hid record later discovered by people of Limhi.
- **Ezias** (/iːˈzaɪəs/), ancient prophet who testified in same manner as Zenock, Isaiah^{1}, and Jeremiah, argued by Reynolds to be same as the Esaias^{,} who lived in days of Abraham.

== G ==
- Gadianton, a Nephite dissenter and chief of Gadianton robbers (c. 50 BC). Flattered Kiskumen to become leader of robber band, but after failing to kill Helaman^{3}, fled to the wilderness. Later conspired in murder of chief judge Cezoram and his son, received secret oaths and covenants from the devil, and nearly destroyed Nephites.
- Gazelem, a seer (or, alternatively, a seer stone) prepared by God to see secret works of darkness.^{,}
- Gid, Nephite military officer and chief captain over band appointed to guard prisoners. Reported to Helaman^{2} the death and escape of rebellious prisoners, and took part in a strategy to capture Lamanite cities (c. 63 BC).
- Giddianhi (/ˌɡɪdiˈænhaɪ/), chief of Gadianton robbers who arrogantly demanded Nephite lands from Lachoneus^{1}, then commanded followers to go to battle against Nephites. Defeated and slain (c. AD 16–21).
- Giddonah^{1} (/ɡɪˈdoʊnɑː/), Amulek's father and son of Ishmael^{3}, named as Amulek's authority for preaching to people of Ammonihah.
- Giddonah^{2}, high priest and chief judge in Gideon who was challenged by the antichrist Korihor (c. 75 BC).
- Gideon, Nephite patriot and counselor to king Limhi. A strong man who fought King Noah^{3}, but spared his life. Later sent men into the wilderness to search for Noah^{3} and his priests, counselled with Limhi regarding dealings with Lamanite king, proposed a plan for escaping from Lamanites, taught in the Church, and withstood the antichrist Nehor, but was slain by Nehor. A valley and a city were named after him (c. 145–91 BC).
- Gidgiddonah (/ˌɡɪdɡɪˈdoʊnɑː/), Nephite commander slain with his 10,000 at battle of Cumorah (c. AD 385).
- **Gidgiddoni**, Nephite commander, prophet, and judge appointed by Lachoneus^{1} to lead forces against followers of Gadianton robber Giddianhi. Gidgiddoni refused the people's petition for offensive campaign, stockpiled weapons, and defeated the robbers when attacked. His campaign established a great peace (c. AD 16).
- Gilead, brother of Shared, who slew part of army of Coriantumr^{2} when they were drunk, and took over Coriantumr^{2}'s throne.
- Gilgah (/ˈɡɪlɡɑː/), second son of Jared^{2}, an early Jaredite who walked humbly before God and refused kingship.
- Gilgal, Nephite commander lost in final battle at Cumorah (c. AD 385).

== H ==
- Hagoth, Nephite ship builder, curious man who built ships to find those who went northward. Some of the ships disappeared and were never heard from again (c. 55 BC).
- Hearthom, righteous middle Jaredite king who lost kingdom after 24 years and fell into captivity. Son of Lib^{1}, and father of Heth^{2}.
- Helam (/ˈhiːləm/), convert from people of Noah^{3} and first of those baptized by Alma^{1} (c. 147 BC). Likely namesake of city and land of Helam.^{,}
- Helaman^{1}, third son of King Benjamin (c. 130 BC), brother of Mosiah^{2} and Helorum. Taught by their father to read the writings in their original language.
- **Helaman^{2}**, eldest son of Alma^{2}, prophet and military commander. Maintained records, prophesied Nephite destruction, preached and baptized many, and reestablished church. Persuaded Ammonites to keep their oath to lay down arms, and was followed into battle by 2,000 of their young stripling sons. With help of Antipus, defeated Lamanites by means of decoy. Corresponded with Moroni^{1} and Ammoron. After battles, returned to Zarahemla where he continued to preach until his death (c. 74–56 BC).
- **Helaman^{3}**, sixth Nephite chief judge and eldest son of Helaman^{2}. Received records from Shiblon and was appointed a judge. The plot of Gadianton robber Kishkumen to murder him failed because of the intervention of a servant. Lived righteously and fathered Nephi^{2} and Lehi^{4} (c. 53 BC).
- Helem (/ˈhiːlɛm/), brother of Ammon^{2} and a seeker of people of Zeniff.
- Helorum (/hiːˈlɔːrəm/), second son of King Benjamin (c. 130 BC), brother of Mosiah^{2} and Helaman^{1}. Mentioned by name in only one verse, but was addressed with his brothers by King Benjamin. Taught by their father to read the writings in their original language.
- Hem (/hɛm/), brother of Ammon^{2} and a seeker of people of Zeniff.
- Heth^{1}, unrighteous middle Jaredite king who rebelled, slew his father, and brought about famine, causing many followers to emigrate to Zarahemla. Son of Com^{1}, and father of Shez^{1}.
- Heth^{2}, middle Jaredite in line of kingly succession, who lived in captivity all his days. Son of Hearthom, grandson of on of Lib^{1}, and ancestor of Aaron^{2}.
- High priest of Gilead, who murdered Gilead as he sat on his throne, and who was in turn murdered by Lib^{2} in a secret pass.
- Himni, youngest son of Mosiah^{2}, unbeliever who tried to destroy the Church, was converted by an angel, and traveled through Zarahemla with brothers to repair injuries they had done. Left in charge of the Church when Alma^{2} and companions began their missionary journey (c. 100–74 BC).

== I ==
- Isabel, harlot in land of Siron who stole many hearts, and who was chased after by Corianton (c. 75 BC). One of only three named women unique to the Book of Mormon, along with Sariah and Abish.
- **Isaiah^{1}**, Hebrew prophet extensively quoted by Nephi^{1}, Jacob^{2}, Abinadi, and the resurrected Jesus Christ (c. 800 BC).
- Isaiah^{2}, one of twelve Nephite disciples chosen by the resurrected Jesus Christ. Taught multitude, prayed, encircled by fire, among either nine taken up into heavens or three allowed to remain (c. AD 34).
- Ishmael^{2}, an Ephraimite from Jerusalem who travelled with his household into the wilderness with families of Lehi^{1} and Zoram^{1}. Father of sons and daughters who married travelling companions and often rebelled.
- Ishmael^{3}, father of Giddonah^{1} and grandfather of Amulek, in his line of authority for preaching to people of Ammonihah.

== J ==
- Jacob^{1}, Biblical patriarch and an ancestor of Lehi^{1}, whose name was found on brass plates of Laban, whose words were cited by Moroni^{1}, and whose house is referenced frequently in the Book of Mormon.
- **Jacob^{2}**, righteous fifth son of Lehi^{1}, a Nephite prophet and record keeper. Accompanied brother Nephi^{1} into wilderness, consecrated as priest and teacher, quoted Isaiah^{1}, saw destruction of Jerusalem in vision, and was given the small plates where he recorded spiritual things. Confounded Sherem and later gave plates to his son Enos^{2} (c. 599 BC).
- Jacob^{3}, Nephite apostate and Zoramite captain, who left city Mulek to fight decoy set by Teancum, was surprised by army of Lehi^{3}, and thereby lost command of city to Moroni^{1}. Killed in ensuring battle (c. 64 BC).
- Jacob^{4}, Nephite apostate who was chosen king by secret combination. Seeing he was outnumbered, commanded his people to flee and establish kingdom in north. His city, Jacobugath, was burned (c. AD 29–30).
- Jacom, first son of Jared^{2}. Early Jaredite who walked humbly before God and refused kingship.
- **Jared^{2}**, founder and righteous first leader of Jaredites. Came from Tower of Babel with brother and friends. Father to Jacom, Gilgah, Mahah, Orihah, and eight daughters. Asked brother to pray that their language not be confounded. After landing in new world, argued against a monarchy, but relented in the face of people's resistance. Record was explicated by Moroni^{2}.
- Jared^{3}, unrighteous middle Jaredite king who seized kingdom from his father Omer. Brother of Esrom and Coriantumr^{1}, who retook the kingdom and restored it to their father. Worked in secret combinations with his daughter and Akish to regain kingdom. Slain by Akish's band.
- **Jarom**, Nephite record keeper and primary author of Book of Jarom who saw many wars and grieved over stiff-neckedness of Lamanites. Contrasted their blood-thirsty ways with the well-being of his own people. Son or descendant of Enos^{2} and father of Omni (c. 399–361 BC).
- Jeneum (/ˈdʒɛniəm/), Nephite commander lost in final battle at Cumorah (c. AD 385).
- Jeremiah^{2}, one of twelve Nephite disciples chosen by the resurrected Jesus Christ. Taught multitude, prayed, encircled by fire, among either nine taken up into heavens or three allowed to remain (c. AD 34).
- **Jesus Christ**, Savior and Redeemer, who appeared as a resurrected Being to the Nephite people, taught and blessed them. Prophesied of by name and by titles throughout the Lehite diaspora until his appearance (c. 34 AD).
- Jonas^{1}, son of Nephi^{3}, and one of twelve Nephite disciples chosen by the resurrected Jesus Christ. Taught multitude, prayed, encircled by fire, among either nine taken up into the heavens or three allowed to remain (c. AD 34).
- Jonas^{2}, one of twelve Nephite disciples chosen by the resurrected Jesus Christ. Taught multitude, prayed, encircled by fire, among either nine taken up into the heavens or three allowed to remain (c. AD 34).
- Joseph^{2}, sixth son of Lehi^{1} who followed his brother Nephi^{1} into the wilderness and was a just and holy man (c. 595 BC).
- Josh, Nephite commander lost in final battle at Cumorah (c. AD 385).
- Judge in Ammonihah (unnamed), of order of Nehor. Burned believers. Smote, starved, and imprisoned Alma^{2} and Amulek. Killed by collapse of prison walls (c. 81 BC).

== K ==
- Kib, righteous early Jaredite king and father of Corihor^{1}, who took him into captivity, and Shule, who freed him and restored him to his throne. Son of Orihah.
- Kim, rebellious middle Jaredite king and son of Morianton^{1}, who was taken into captivity by his own brother. Father of Levi^{2}.
- Kimnor (/ˈkɪmnɔːr/), early Jaredite, father of Akish.
- King Benjamin (see Benjamin)
- King of the Lamanites^{1} (unnamed), who subjugated Limhi and his people. Slain during battle with people of Limhi (c. 121 BC).
- King of the Lamanites^{2} (unnamed), who was father of Lamoni and Anti-Nephi-Lehi, and who was converted by Aaron^{3} (c. 90 BC).
- King of the Lamanites^{3} (unnamed), who was slain by Amalickiah's servant (c. 72 BC).
- King of the Lamanites^{4} (unnamed), to whom Nephite dissenters appealed. Possibly the same as, or a successor to, Tubaloth (c. 38 BC).
- King of the Lamanites^{5} (possibly Aaron^{4}, or his unnamed successor), who sent an epistle to Mormon (c. 360 AD).
- Kish, middle Jaredite king about whom little is known; father of Lib^{1} and son of Corom, two righteous kings.
- Kishkumen, co-founder of Gadianton robbers. Secretly murdered Pahoran^{2} and escaped justice because of secret combinations. His plan to kill Helaman^{3} was foiled, leading to his murder.
- Korihor, antichrist who was successful in Zarahemla and Gideon, but was run out of Jershon. Debated Giddonah^{2} and Alma^{2}, was struck dumb, then trodden down by Zoramites (c. 74 BC).
- Kumen (/ˈkuːmən/), one of twelve Nephite disciples chosen by the resurrected Jesus Christ. Taught multitude, prayed, encircled by fire, among either nine taken up into the heavens or three allowed to remain (c. AD 34).
- Kumenonhi (/ˌkuːməˈnɒnhaɪ/), one of twelve Nephite disciples chosen by the resurrected Jesus Christ. Taught multitude, prayed, encircled by fire, among either nine taken up into the heavens or three allowed to remain (c. AD 34).

== L ==
- Laban, custodian of the brass plates who refused to turn them over to sons of Lehi^{1}, and confiscated their riches when they attempted to purchase the plates. Slain by Nephi^{1}, who used Laban's sword as a model for others (c. 600 BC).
- Lachoneus^{1}, eleventh known Nephite chief judge, who received a threatening epistle from Giddianhi (the robber leader), then gathered his people and prepared fortifications. Prophesied and called his people to repentance. Appointed Gidgiddoni as commander of Nephites. After battles and ending of a siege, peace ensued (c. AD 1).
- Lachoneus^{2}, son of Lachoneus^{1}, twelfth known (and last) Nephite chief judge whose people became proud and wicked (c. AD 29–30).
- Lamah (/ˈleɪmə/), Nephite commander lost in final battle at Cumorah (c. AD 385).
- Laman^{1}, rebellious eldest son of Lehi^{1} and brother to Lemuel, Sam, Nephi^{1}, Jacob^{2}, and Joseph^{2}. Travelled into the wilderness with his family, murmured against his father and his younger brother Nephi^{1}, failed to obtain brass plates from Laban, smote brothers, stirred up Lemuel and sons of Ishmael^{2} to kill Nephi^{1}, chastised by an angel, and brought generational curse upon own family and followers, who were named Lamanites after him (c. 600 BC).
- Laman^{2}, Lamanite king and father of Laman^{3}. Deceived Zeniff and stirred up his people against him (c. 200 B.C.).
- Laman^{3}, son of Laman^{2} and a king of the Lamanites, who appointed Amulon to power, then subjugated him (c. 178 BC).
- Laman^{4}, Nephite soldier sought out by Moroni^{1} because he was a direct descendant of Laman^{1} and former servant of the Lamanite king^{3} slain by Amalickiah's servant. Enticed Lamanite guards to drunkenness, thereby allowing Nephite prisoners to escape city of Gid (c. 178 BC).
- **Lamoni**, descendant of Ishmael^{2} and a Lamanite king dramatically converted by Ammon^{3}. While being taught by Ammon^{3} he fell to the earth, as did his wife, overcome by Spirit. Their revival lead to conversion of many. Accompanied Ammon^{3} to Middoni to free the prisoners there—during which journey he met his father, who threatened to kill them both, but who was later converted. Upon return, taught his people, built synagogues, and counseled in defense of Anti-Nephi-Lehies (c. 178 BC).
- Leader (unnamed), bloodthirsty head of first of two expeditions returning to Land of Nephi, which expeditions are described in books of Omni and Mosiah, and both of which included Zeniff (c. 200 BC).
- **Lehi^{1}**, Hebrew prophet who led family and followers to promised land in western hemisphere. Father of Laman^{1}, Lemuel, Nephi^{1}, Sam, Jacob^{2}, Joseph^{2}, and several daughters. Recipient of Liahona. His visions foretold major divisions described throughout the Book of Mormon. When his son Nephi^{1} broke his bow and family went hungry, murmured against God, but repented and continued prophesying to end of his life (c. 600 BC).
- Lehi^{2}, son of Zoram^{2} who went with his father and brother Aha to rescue their captured brethren (c. 81 BC).
- Lehi^{3}, Nephite military commander (possibly same as Lehi^{2}), who assisted Moroni^{1} in defeating Lamanites, became chief captain over city of Noah, took command of city of Mulek, fought alongside Teancum, and assisted Moronihah^{1} (c. 74 BC).
- **Lehi^{4}**, Nephite missionary, younger son of Helaman^{3}, who with brothers Nephi^{2} and Moronihah^{1}, was instrumental in converting 8,000 Lamanites. In land of Nephi, cast into prison with brother, protected by a pillar of fire, conversed with angels, brought down prison walls, and with faith wrought change upon Lamanites (c. 45 BC).
- Lehonti (/liːˈhɒntaɪ/), Lamanite officer who was lured into trap by Amalickiah and poisoned (c. 72 BC).
- Lemuel, rebellious second son of Lehi^{1} and brother to Laman^{1}, Sam, Nephi^{1}, Jacob^{2}, and Joseph^{2}. Travelled into the wilderness with his family, murmured against his father and younger brother Nephi^{1}, failed to obtain brass plates from Laban, smote brothers, stirred up Laman^{1} and sons of Ishmael^{2} to kill Nephi^{1}, was chastised by an angel, became follower of Laman^{1}, thereby bringing a generational curse upon own family (c. 600 BC).
- Levi^{2}, righteous middle Jaredite king who fought way out of captivity and ruled justly. Father of Corom, and son of Kim.
- Lib^{1} (/lɪb/), righteous middle Jaredite king who rid land of serpents and became a great hunter. Son of Kish, and father of Hearthom.
- Lib^{2}, wicked late Jaredite king and brother of Shiz, who fought the last Jaredite king Coriantumr^{2} for control of the kingdom, worked in secret combinations, murdered Gilead, and was killed by Coriantumr^{2}. Lib^{2} was the largest man in the kingdom.
- Limhah (/ˈlɪmhɑː/), Nephite commander lost in final battle at Cumorah (c. AD 385).
- Limher, Nephite spy in Amlicite campaign, along with Amnor, Manti, and Zeram (c. 87 BC).
- **Limhi**, righteous son of Noah^{3}, and third and final Nephite king in land of Lehi-Nephi. While in bondage to Lamanites—and after three unsuccessful rebellions—encountered Ammon^{1} and brethren, learned their good news from Zarahemla, and shared with them record of Zeniff. Invited them to preach to his people, then planned their joint escape on advice of Gideon. Taught and baptized by Alma^{1}, and joined people of king Mosiah^{2}, to whom he gave the 24 gold plates of Jaredite prophet Ether (c. 121 BC).
- Luram (/ˈlʊərəm/), Nephite soldier, one of three "choice men" slain in battle (c. AD 375).

== M ==
- Mahah, third son of Jared^{2}, an early Jaredite who walked humbly before God and refused kingship.
- Manti, Nephite spy in Amlicite campaign, along with Amnor, Limher, and Zeram (c. 87 BC).
- Mathoni (/məˈθoʊnaɪ/), brother of Mathonihah, and one of twelve Nephite disciples chosen by the resurrected Jesus Christ. Taught multitude, prayed, encircled by fire, among either nine taken up into the heavens or three allowed to remain (c. AD 34).
- Mathonihah (/ˌmæθoʊˈnaɪhɑː/), brother of Mathoni, and one of twelve Nephite disciples chosen by the resurrected Jesus Christ. Taught multitude, prayed, encircled by fire, among either nine taken up into the heavens or three allowed to remain (c. AD 34).
- Morianton^{1} (/ˌmɒriˈæntən/), just middle Jaredite king in lineage of Ether, who re-established kingdom after many generations and eased burden of the people, though he himself was cut off from God. Descendant of Riplakish; father of Kim and at least one other son.
- Morianton^{2}, founder of Nephite city of Morianton, Nephite traitor and ruler of people of Morianton, instigator of Lehi-Morianton border dispute. Sought to invade land of Lehi, but when he beat one of his maid servants, she fled to tell Moroni^{1} of his plans. During ensuing battle, slain by Teancum and army was taken captive (c. 68 BC).
- Mormon^{1}, father of Mormon^{2} and a descendant of Nephi^{1} (c. AD 322).
- **Mormon^{2}**, abridger and keeper of Nephite record, military commander, historian. Visited by Ammaron at age 10 and instructed to take record from the hill Shim when 24 years old. Following year, taken south by his father to Zarahemla. At age 15 experienced theophany and, being large in stature, appointed military leader over Nephites. Repeatedly withdrew in face of combined forces of Lamanites and robbers; attributed military losses to wickedness of Nephites. At age 24 retrieved buried plates and began work of recording. Resigned leadership, witnessed near total destruction of his people, buried the large plates, and turned over small plates to Moroni^{2} (c. AD 333).
- Moron, late Jaredite king who reigned during a time of great wickedness and turmoil, and was himself wicked. Lost half his kingdom for many years because of a rebellion and, after regaining kingdom, was completely overthrown and lived out his life in captivity. Son of Ethem, father of Coriantor, grandfather or ancestor of the prophet Ether.
- **Moroni^{1}**, known as Captain Moroni, Nephite military commander. Took command of all Nephite armies at age 25. Equipped followers sufficiently to intimidate Lamanites armies, who fled. Sent out spies and sought prophetic advice from Alma^{2} to defend liberty, lands, and Church. Engaged in largely successful military campaigns against larger armies. Demanded surrender of Zerahemnah, who refused, and was scalped during an attempted attack. Upon learning of Amalickiah's dissent, raised title of liberty to inspire steadfastness. Cut off enemy troops. Put to death those who continued to rebel. Rebuilt city of Ammonihah and fortified cities to repel attack. Ended rebellion of Morianton^{2}. Contended with authoritarian king-men, reinforced Teancum's troops, wounded while retaking Mulek, and sent Laman^{4} to retake Gid by decoy. Corresponded with Pahoran^{1}, with whom he retook city of Nephihah, raising standard of liberty wherever he went. Yielded command of army to Moronihah^{1} before death (c. 99–56 BC).
- **Moroni^{2}**, prophet, last Nephite, son of Mormon^{2}. One of only 24 to survive last great battle at Cumorah. Received small number of plates from father in order to protect remainder from destruction. Worked to finish record, abridged record of Ether, mourned loss of Nephite civilization, and warned unbelievers before sealing up record (c. AD 421). In Latter-day Saint faith, was the angelic messenger who appeared to, taught, and delivered plates to Joseph Smith.
- Moronihah^{1}, righteous Nephite general, son of Moroni^{1}. Received command of armies from father, drove back Lamanites, surprised by Coriantumr^{3}'s invasion. Defeated invaders to retake city of Zarahemla. Peace interrupted, driven back into Bountiful by army of Nephite dissenters. Slaughter attributed to Nephite corruption. Taught repentance, and thereby regained half of lost territory (c. 60 BC).
- Moronihah^{2}, Nephite general who perished at final battle of Cumorah, along with his ten-thousand (c. AD 385).
- Mosiah^{1}, Nephite prophet and king of land of Zarahemla, who had gift of interpretation. Translated stone record of the Mulekites. Father of King Benjamin (c. 200 BC).
- **Mosiah^{2}**, Nephite prophet and king, and also seer who could translate by means of interpreters. Eldest son of King Benjamin. He and brothers taught by their father to read writings in their original language. Near end of life, advocated for an end of monarchy and adoption of judges; he was therefore last of Nephite kings. Among accomplishments was establishment of a permanent system of measures. His once wayward sons (Aaron^{3}, Ammon^{3}, Himni, and Omner) converted and become influential missionaries (c. 154–91 BC).
- Mulek, purported to be last son of Jewish king Zedekiah^{1}. After death of brothers, escaped Jerusalem and was brought across the sea to new land with group of people known variously as people of Zarahemla, seed of Zedekiah^{1}, people of Mulek, and colloquially, as the Mulekites. Ancestor of Zarahemla, and namesake of Nephite land to the north, and eastern shore city south of Bountiful (c. 597 BC).
- Muloki (/ˈmjuːləkaɪ/), Nephite missionary, companion of Aaron^{3} and Ammah, imprisoned in Middoni, rescued by Ammon^{3}.

== N ==
- Nehor, Nephite apostate, religious theorist, antichrist. Proclaimed against Church, contended with Gideon, grew angry and slew Gideon, condemned by Alma^{2} for murder and for introducing priestcraft. Executed and died "ignominious" death (c. 91 BC). Namesake of the Order of Nehors (an indigenous religion, originating from but separate to the Nephite religion).
- **Nephi^{1}**, prophet, founder and king of eponymous Nephite civilization, fourth son of Lehi^{1}. Favored of God, kept own record, abridged father's record. Left Jerusalem, commanded to recover brass plates, smitten by brothers but protected by angel. After failed attempt to purchase plates, encountered drunken Laban, slew him, obtained plates, persuaded Zoram^{1} to join him, returned again for Ishmael^{2} and family. Saw father's dream and vision of future promised land and ministry of Christ. Forbidden to write some parts. When hunting bow broke, used Liahona to obtain food. Commanded to build ship, crossed ocean, quoted Isaiah^{1}, contended with and separated from brothers, passed plates to brother Jacob^{2} before death (c. 600 BC).
- **Nephi^{2}**, influential Nephite missionary, seventh Nephite chief judge, son of Helaman^{3} and brother of Lehi^{4}. Resigned as judge to preach, converted 8,000 Lamanites. Imprisoned with brother, protected by angels, prison walls shaken, encircled with fire, converted larger number of Lamanites. Sorrowed over rise of Gadianton band, taught multitude from garden tower, revealed secret murderer of judge Seezoram, praised by voice from heaven, conveyed away from persecutors, invoked famine, baptized converts of Samuel^{2}, continued working miracles, disappeared (c. 45 BC).
- **Nephi^{3},** known as Nephi the Disciple, eldest son of Nephi^{2}. Given charge of plates, prayed over wickedness of people, heard voice of Lord, learned of Christ's imminent birth. Saw night without darkness and new star. Baptized many, visited by angels, cast out devils, raised brother Timothy from the dead. At appearance of resurrected Christ, first called of the twelve.^{,} Baptized other disciples, commanded to bring records. Taught multitude, prayed, encircled by fire, among either nine taken up into the heavens or three allowed to remain (c. AD 34).
- Nephi^{4}, first keeper of record documenting miracles and peace that prevailed for two centuries after visit by Christ. Son of Nephi^{3}, father of Amos^{2}. Passed record to son before death.
- Nephihah (/niːˈfaɪhɑː/), second Nephite chief judge (c. 83–67 BC). Succeeded Alma^{2} the Younger when Alma^{2} had surrendered judgment seat to him to devote more time to missionary work. Son Pahoran^{1} inherited judgment seat after his death.
- **Neum** (/ˈniːəm/), Hebrew prophet, quoted by Nephi^{1}, who prophesied Christ's crucifixion. By metaphor, the Biblical prophet Nahum's foretelling of the destruction of Nineveh (c. 612 BC) may be that same prophecy referenced by Nephi^{1}.
- Nimrah (/ˈnɪmrɑː/), Jaredite son of Akish, maternal grandson of Jared^{3}. Angry that his father had starved his brother, fled with a small band to great-grandfather Omer. Later joined by his other brothers and restored kingdom to Omer.
- Nimrod^{1}, great biblical hunter after whom a Mesopotamian valley was purportedly named.
- Nimrod^{2}, early Jaredite king who turned over the kingdom to Shule and received great favors in return. Son of Corihor^{2} and grandson of Noah^{2}.
- Noah^{2}, unrighteous early Jaredite king, son of Corihor^{1}. Rebelled against his father, battled Shule, obtained part of the kingdom including the land of first inheritance and Moron, slain by sons of Shule. Father of Cohor^{2}.
- Noah^{3}, an iniquitous Nephite king, son of Zeniff and father of Limhi. Heavily taxed his people, ordered Abinadi slain, and accused Alma^{1} of sedition. Life was later spared by Gideon, so fled into the wilderness and commanded followers to desert their wives and children. Burned to death (c. 160 BC).

== O ==
- Omer, righteous middle Jaredite king, son of Shule and father to Emer, Jared^{3}, Esrom, and Coriantumr^{1}. Overthrown by Jared^{3}, spent half of days in captivity, until sons regained kingdom for him. Jared^{3} and his daughter plotted with Akish to overthrow Omer's kingdom. Warned by God, escaped with family. Later joined by great-grandsons Nimrah and brothers, who restored his kingdom.
- Omner, third son of Mosiah^{2}, unbeliever who tried to destroy the Church, was converted by an angel, and traveled through Zarahemla with brothers to repair injuries they had done (c. 100–74 BC).
- Omni, Nephite record keeper and son of Jarom. Fought with sword to preserve his people. Admitted own wickedness and bemoaned wars and bloodshed. Passed record to son Amaron (c. 390 BC).
- Orihah, first Jaredite king, fourth son of Jared^{2}. Walked humbly, executed righteous judgment. Fathered 31 sons and daughters, including Kib.

== P ==
- Paanchi, Nephite rebel and son of Pahoran^{1}, who contended with brothers Pahoran^{2} and Pacumeni for judgment seat. Angry when older brother was appointed, caused rebellion. Condemned to death, which lead to assassination of Pahoran^{2} (c. 52 BC).
- Pachus (/ˈpeɪkəs/), rebel king of Nephite dissenters in Zarahemla who allied with Ammoron, drove freemen from land, battled with Moroni^{1} and Pahoran^{1}, and was slain (c. 61 BC).
- Pacumeni (/peɪˈkjuːmənaɪ/), fifth Nephite chief judge, son of Pahoran^{1}, brother of Pahoran^{2}, and contender for judgment seat. After assassination of brother by Gadianton robber Kishkumen, acquired judgment seat briefly. Lamanite invader Coriantumr^{3} caught Pacumeni fleeing, killed him at city wall. Helaman^{3} succeeded as chief judge (c. 52 BC).
- Pagag (/ˈpeɪɡɑːɡ/), eldest son of the Brother of Jared^{2}, who refused offer to become king.
- Pahoran^{1}, steadfast third Nephite chief judge, son of Nephihah. Supported by freemen; opposed by high-born king-men. Democratic vote for liberty gave Moroni^{1} mandate to silence rebel king-men. Corresponded with Moroni^{1} over inability to defend forces of Helaman^{2} and news of insurrection that drove him and supporters from land. Joined defenders to put down rebellions and overcome Lamanite forces. Resumed judgment seat. Father of Pahoran^{2}, Paanchi, Pacumeni, and others (c. 68 BC).
- Pahoran^{2}, fourth Nephite chief judge. Eldest of three sons of Pahoran^{1} that contended for judgment seat. Murdered by invading Gadianton robber Kishkumen (c. 52 BC).

== Q ==
- Queen^{1}, wife of Lamoni, who mourned when she thought her husband dead, sent for Ammon^{3}, and spoke in tongues at time of her conversion. Revived by Abish .
- Queen^{2}, mother of Lamoni, who was angry at Aaron^{3} at collapse of her husband, converted when he rose and ministered.
- Queen^{3}, widow of King of the Lamanites^{3} that was slain by Amalickiah. Asked for mercy, fraudulently persuaded the death was inflicted by king's servants, married to Amalickiah who then became king.
- Queen^{4}, wife of Ammoron who told her of the death of Amalickiah before returning to battle against Nephites (c. 66–61 BC).

== R ==
- Riplakish (/rɪpˈleɪkɪʃ/), Jaredite king, who taxed people, executed those who did not labor, had sex, and was killed in an uprising. Son of Shez^{1} and brother of Shez^{2}. After a break in continuity of the kingdom, succeeded by descendant Morianton^{1}.

== S ==
- Sam, third son of Lehi^{1} and brother to Laman^{1}, Lemuel, Nephi^{1}, Jacob^{2}, and Joseph^{2}. Stood by younger brother Nephi^{1} when he was repeatedly abused at hands of older brothers, believed his words, accompanied him into wilderness, blessed by their father and caused him to rejoice (c. 600 BC).
- Samuel^{1}, Hebrew prophet and seer purported by the Book of Mormon to have been one among many who testified of Christ (ca. 1100 BC).
- **Samuel^{2}**, prophet to Nephites, also called Samuel the Lamanite. Warned the iniquitous Nephites at Zarahemla from atop the city wall, foretold Christ's imminent birth and ministry, signs of His forthcoming death and resurrection. While believers desired baptism, disbelievers tried to stone him. He fled (c. 6 BC).
- Sariah, wife of Lehi^{1}, mother of six sons and an unknown number of daughters. Accompanied family from Jerusalem, grieved over sons' apparent disappearance, murmured against Lehi^{1}, rejoiced over sons' return. At elder sons' rebellion, nearly died from grief (c. 600 BC). One of only three named women unique to the Book of Mormon, along with Abish and Isabel.
- Seantum (/siˈæntəm/), fratricidal brother of Nephite judge Seezoram. Member of Gadianton band, whose murder of his brother was revealed by Nephi^{2} through inspiration. Captured by people and tried. Confessed (c. 23 BC).
- Seezoram (/siːˈzɔːrəm/), brother of Seantum and member of Gadianton band, tenth known Nephite chief judge, eventually succeeded by Lachoneus^{1}. How and when he began his reign as chief judge is not known; his first appearance in the Book of Mormon was when Nephi^{2}, son of Helaman, prophesied his murder by hand of his brother, Seantum (c. 23 BC). (Not to be confused with Cezoram, another Nephite chief judge who was assassinated earlier.)
- Servant of Amalickiah (unnamed), who poisoned Lehonti, and likely same who slew king of the Lamanites^{3} (c. 72 BC).
- Servant of Helaman^{3} (unnamed), spy among robber band who learned of Gadianton robber Kishkumen's plan to murder Helaman^{3}, pretended to lead assailant to judgment seat under cover of night, then stabbed him in heart and ran to expose the plot (c. 50 BC).
- Servant of Morianton^{2} (unnamed), woman who—after being beaten by Morianton^{2}—fled to camp of Moroni^{1} and told of her former master's plans to escape to the north (c. 72–67 BC).
- Seth^{2}, late Jaredite, in line of kingly succession, who lived in captivity after his father was killed. Son of Shiblom^{1}, father of Ahah.
- Shared (/ˈʃeɪrəd/), Jaredite military leader and brother of Gilead, who battled Coriantumr^{2} and sons for control of kingdom. For three days engaged in combat with Coriantumr^{2} at battle of Gilgal, severely wounding him but losing own life in the process.
- Shem^{2}, Nephite commander lost in final battle at Cumorah (c. AD 385).
- Shemnon (/ˈʃɛmnɒn/), one of twelve Nephite disciples chosen by the resurrected Jesus Christ. Taught multitude, prayed, encircled by fire, among either nine taken up into heavens or three allowed to remain (c. AD 34).
- Sherem (/ˈʃɛrəm/), an antichrist who used sophistry and flattery to argue against Christ. Discredited by Jacob^{2}, overcome by power of God, confessed own deceit, died (c. fifth century BC). At least one writer argues that Sherem was a son or descendant of Zoram^{1}. Hugh Nibley proposed that "Sherem" means "snub nosed or pug nosed."
- Shez^{1} (/ʃɛz/), righteous middle Jaredite king who outlived rebellious namesake son and rebuilt kingdom. Son or descendant of Heth^{1}, father of Riplakish and Shez^{2}.
- Shez^{2}, rebel son of Shez^{1}, who was killed by a robber. Brother of Riplakish.
- Shiblom^{1} (/ˈʃɪbləm/), (also Shiblon), righteous late Jaredite king and son of Com^{2}, who warred against rebel brother and was slain. Father of Seth^{2}.
- Shiblom^{2}, Nephite commander lost in final battle at Cumorah (c. AD 385).
- Shiblon, Nephite missionary & record-keeper, second son of Alma^{2} (and brother to Helaman^{2} and Corianton). Accompanied father, sons of Mosiah^{2}, and younger brother on mission to Zoramite dissenters. Blessed by father. Preaching lead to peace. Kept records and passed them to Helaman^{3} before death (c. 74 BC).
- Shiz, Jaredite military leader and brother of Lib^{2}. Swore to avenge brother's blood, slew women and children, burnt cities, brutalized civilization. Coriantumr^{2} fought back, exchanged bitter correspondence with Shiz, re-took battlefield, and beheaded him. Their battle lead to the end of Jaredite civilization.
- Son of Cezoram (unnamed), ninth Nephite judge, murdered on judgment seat, as was his father (c. 26 BC).
- Shule (/ʃuːl/), righteous early Jaredite king. Born in captivity after brother Corihor^{1} usurped kingdom from their father Kib. Upon maturity, came to hill Ephraim to molten swords, armed followers, restored kingdom to his father. Eventually became king, executed righteous judgment. Nephew Noah^{2} rebelled, Shule's sons, including Omer, put down rebellion. Cohor^{2} rebelled and was also slain.

== T ==
- Teancum, Nephite military leader. Headed army to stop Morianton^{2} from joining Lamanites. Battled Amalickiah, whom he murdered with javelin in his sleep. Counseled with Moroni^{1} and others to retake Mulek through decoy. Scattered Lamanite defenders, put prisoners to work building fortifications. Provisioned by Pahoran^{1} and later by Moroni^{1}. Under cover of night, slew Ammoron but died in aftermath (c. 67 BC).
- Teomner (/tiˈɒmnər/), Nephite military officer. Participated with Helaman^{2} and Gid in ambush of Lamanites to retake Manti (c. 63 BC).
- Timothy, brother of Nephi^{2}, raised from the dead, one of twelve Nephite disciples chosen by the resurrected Jesus Christ. Taught multitude, prayed, encircled by fire, among either nine taken up into the heavens or three allowed to remain (c. AD 34).
- Tubaloth (/ˈtuːbəlɒθ/), Lamanite king, son of Ammoron, the previous king. Appointed Coriantumr^{3}, a mighty man and Nephite dissenter, to lead his armies (c. 51 BC).

== U ==
- Usurper, late Jaredite king, descendant of the brother of Jared and a "mighty man" of unknown connection to Moron, whom he overthrew, or to Coriantor, whom he kept in captivity.

== W ==
- Wives of Amulon and his brothers (unnamed), daughters of Lamanites who rejected conduct and names of their fathers.
- Wife^{1} of Coriantum^{1} (unnamed), who lived to age 102. She had no children.
- Wife^{2} of Coriantum^{1} (unnamed), who became mother of multiple sons and daughters, including Com^{1}.
- Wife of Ishmael^{2} (unnamed), who left Jerusalem with her family (c. 600 BC). Her daughters married sons of Lehi^{1} and Zoram.
- Wife of Nephi^{1} (unnamed), a daughter of Ishmael^{2}, who defended her husband from attack.
- Wife of Zoram (unnamed), eldest daughter of Ishmael^{2}.

== Z ==
- Zarahemla, leader of Mulek's colony, descendant of Mulek. Discovered by Mosiah^{1}, rejoiced at learning of existence of brass plates containing record of Jews. Learned language of Mosiah^{1}, recited genealogy, provided stone record of Jaredites obtained from Coriantumr^{2}, united with people of Mosiah^{1} (c. 200 BC). Ancestor of Ammon^{2} and Coriantumr^{3}. Zarahemla was namesake of a people, as well as two cities, and a land.
- Zedekiah^{1}, last king of Judah before destruction of Jerusalem by Nebuchadnezzar II (c. 598 BC), frequently mentioned in the Book of Mormon, and there purported to be father of Mulek.
- Zedekiah^{2}, one of twelve Nephite disciples chosen by the resurrected Jesus Christ. Taught multitude, prayed, encircled by fire, among either nine taken up into the heavens or three allowed to remain (c. AD 34).
- Zeezrom, Nephite lawyer in Ammonihah. Expert in rhetorical devices, accused Alma^{2} and Amulek, attempted to bribe Amulek to deny God, caught in own lies. Convinced of God's power, inquired sincerely, astonished at their words. Became sick, healed by Alma^{2}. Converted and baptized, became Nephite missionary (c. 82 BC).
- Zemnarihah (/zɛmnəˈraɪhɑː/), leader of Gadianton band, successor to Giddianhi. Laid siege to Nephites, hampered by lack of provisions, withdrew to head northward, cut off by Gidgiddoni, captured and hanged (c. AD 21).
- Zenephi (/ˈziːnəfaɪ/), military commander who carried off provisions of widows and children, leaving them to die (c. AD 400).^{,}
- Zeniff, father of Noah^{3}, grandfather of Limhi, and righteous leader of expedition of Nephites who left Zarahemla to land of Lehi-Nephi (c. 200 BC). Record comprises Mosiah 9 through 22. Sent to spy among Lamanites, covenanted with King Laman^{2} to possess land of Lehi-Nephi. Made king, betrayed by Laman^{2}, and drove out Lamanite invaders before dying.
- **Zenock**, apocryphal prophet of ancient Israel. Predicted Christ's crucifixion, testified of mercy of God, quoted by Alma^{2}, prophesied destruction at advent of Christ.
- **Zenos**, apocryphal prophet of ancient Israel. Foretold three days of darkness at Christ's crucifixion and gathering of Israel, quoted by Jacob^{2}, testified of redemption through Christ, slain for boldness of testimony.
- Zerahemnah (/zɛrəˈhɛmnə/), Lamanite commander who appointed bitter Amalekites and Zoramites as chief captains to stir up hatred toward Nephites. Army intimidated by Moroni^{1}'s arms and departed. Gathered again at Sidon where Moroni^{1} demanded surrender and oath to cease warring. Handed over weapons but refused oath. Lost scalp in attempt on Moroni^{1}'s life. In ensuing battle, relented and took oath (c. 74 BC).
- Zeram (/ˈziːrəm/), Nephite military officer, one of several spies (including with Amnor, Limher, and Manti) sent to watch camp of the Amlicites (c. 87 BC).
- Zoram^{1}, servant of Laban who held keys to treasury, and, after learning of death of Laban, accompanied family of Lehi^{1} into the wilderness. There he married eldest daughter of Ishmael^{2}, became follower and true friend of Nephi^{1}. Ammoron one of his descendants (c. 600 BC).
- Zoram^{2}, chief captain over Nephite armies, father of Lehi^{2} and Aha. Sought prophetic advice from Alma^{2} to track captured people. Scattered Lamanites at river Sidon, reclaimed captives (c. 81 BC).
- Zoram^{3}, an antichrist. Leader of apostate sect of Nephites, the Zoramites, who trampled Korihor to death. Instigated idol worship, to the dismay of Alma^{2} (c. 74 BC).

== See also ==
- List of Book of Mormon groups
- List of Book of Mormon places
- List of Mormon place names
- List of Book of Mormon prophets
- Book of Mormon rulers
- Jaredite kings
