= Book of Mormon monetary system =

Use of money throughout the Book of Mormon

The Book of Mormon monetary system is part of the setting of the Book of Mormon. It is the system of economic exchange that the narrative describes as being used by the Nephites. Mormon, the internal narrator of the Book of Mormon, first introduces the system in the internal Book of Alma. When Alma and Amulek preach in Ammonihah, the lawyer Zeezrom unsuccessfully attempts to bribe Amulek to deny the existence of God. Setting forth the system as a background for this account, Mormon, the narrator, outlines the value relationship between precious metals and grains. There is no evidence for this sort of system being used in the Pre-Columbian era Americas.

== Book of Mormon explanation ==
High-value pieces
Gold	Silver
1 Senine	1 Senum
1 Seon, 2 Senines	1 Amnor
1 Shum, 4 Senines	1 Ezrom
1 Limnah, 7 Senines	1 Onti

Low-value pieces
Piece	Gold	Silver
Shiblon	1/2 Senine	1/2 Senum
Shiblum	1/4 Senine	1/4 Senum
Leah	1/8 Senine	1/8 Senum

Other
Gold	Value in pieces
Antion	3 Shiblons

Weights and measures
Gold	Silver	Measure	Day's wages
	Leah	0.125	
	Shiblum	0.25	
	Shiblon	0.5	
Senine	Senum	1.0	1.0
Antion		1.5	
Seon	Amnor	2.0	
Shum	Ezrom	4.0	
Limnah	Onti	7.0	

== Background ==
In the Book of Mormon, the Nephites are the descendants of diasporic Israelites who leave Jerusalem just prior to the Babylonian captivity, migrate to the ancient Americas, and establish a society of what literary critic Terryl Givens calls "pre-Christian Christians." Over time, the Nephites industrialize, build urban landscapes, and develop institutions to support a capitalist economy of market exchange. Susan Curtis, a historian of the United States, compares Book of Mormon statements about "exceeding industrious[ness]" among the people it describes to "assumptions about hard work, regularity, commerce, and accumulation sustained by a Victorian sensibility" prevalent in nineteenth-century America in the wake of the Second Great Awakening "ideology of individual responsibility" that comported with "emerging market capitalism in America."

Generations after the establishment of Nephite society, Mosiah, king of the Nephites, establishes a unified system for exchange. This system is introduced by the in-setting narrator, Mormon, in the book of Alma when a lawyer in Ammonihah named Zeezrom attempts to bribe a missionary named Amulek. Zeezrom says he will pay Amulek six onties if the latter will profess that God does not exist, which would have been worth about 42 days of wages for a judge in Ammonihah. Amulek declines the bribe.

Author Brant A. Gardner thinks the system could have been used in other cities as well. According to religious studies professor Grant Hardy, the system was the result of "trial and error".

=== Historicity ===
No form of fiat currency, such as measures of gold for grain as described in the Book of Mormon, is known to have actually existed in any pre-Columbian culture. The vast majority of ancient Native American economies were gift economies, which do not use any form of currency and instead rely on reciprocal exchanges governed by social goodwill. Limited use of commodity currencies existed in large empires, such as in Mesoamerica where cacao beans were sometimes used.

== In Mormon Studies ==
=== Pieces versus coins ===
Multiple names of Book of Mormon people and lands such as Antionum resemble the names of Nephite currency. Latter-day Saint author George Reynolds believes some currency is named after "well known or distinguished persons". Reynolds believes that the Shiblon, Shiblum, and Leah are made of silver.

Editions of the Book of Mormon published by the LDS Church before 1981 included a chapter heading (not part of the text originally dictated by Joseph Smith) describing this monetary system as "Nephite coinage." The narrative text of the Book of Mormon calls the currency "pieces." Since coinage was not used in pre-Columbian Americas, the LDS Church's 1981 and subsequent editions of the Book of Mormon removed the reference to "coinage" in its headings out of "a desire to preempt a potential accusation of anachronism," economist Shinji Takagi writes.

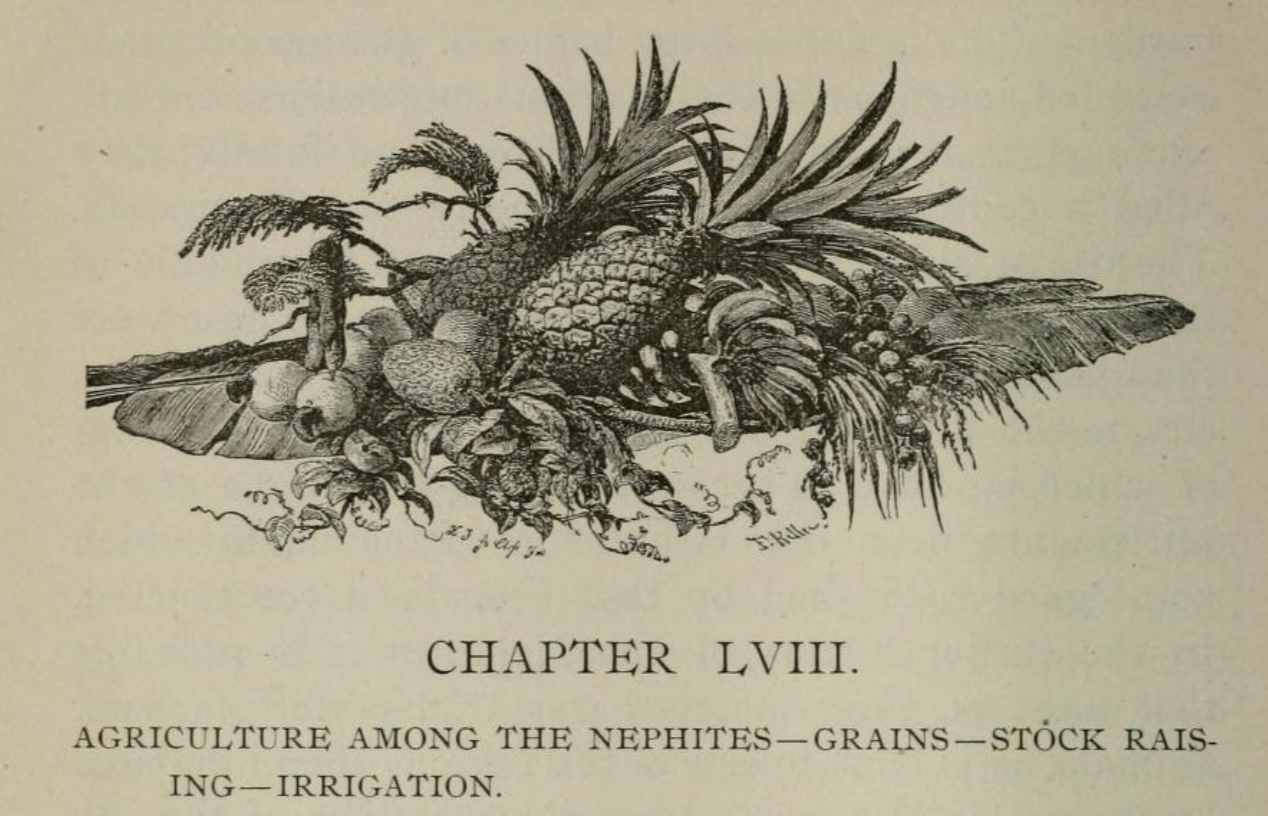
Agriculture Among the Nephites (1888)

=== Role of grain ===
Each unit in the Book of Mormon's monetary system is linked in value to "a measure of barley, and also for a measure of every kind of grain," implying that in the setting, the Nephites harvest barley and other grains and may pay their taxes in grain. Within the Book of Mormon, grain is the Nephites' standard in determining monetary worth; the quantity of a measure is not given.

Sorenson explains that ancient peoples, such as those within Egypt, also connected currency to grain. Others supplemented their commerce with cattle.

=== Numerical values ===
The narrator in the Book of Alma structures the list so that the money pieces progressively increase in value.

Lawyer and Latter-day Saint Corbin Volluz explores the Nephite monetary system in an essay discussing the significance of the number seven in the setting of the Book of Mormon. He explains that the monetary structure depends on iterations of seven, noting that many of the values added up to it.

=== Use among Nephites ===
G. St. John Stott interprets the system of measures as meaning prices for grain were fixed and not allowed to fluctuate. Takagi holds that the Book of Mormon narrative describes its setting as including private enterprises in which merchants have "free intercourse one with another, to buy and to sell." As such, according to Takagi the narrative's description of grain-based fixed-value for currency describes a system of valuation for accounting purposes and calculating legal fines, rather than implying Nephite society in the Book of Alma uses fixed prices in a command economy. Takagi compares this to "monetary values assigned to wrongful acts by casuistic laws in the Covenant Code" found in the biblical Book of Exodus.

Though Mosiah institutes the system with beneficial intent, people in the narrative use money as a motive, leading to misconduct. In Ammonihah, judges and debtors are especially interested in money and its benefits. Latter-day Saint and assistant professor of finance at Williamette University for the Atkinson Graduate School of Management, Robert Couch interprets Nephite currency in a social light. His interpretation involves an analysis of the wealthy using money to climb the social echelon and gain more power. The Book of Mormon refers to this as "getting gain." Couch deduces that Ammonihahites with authoritative positions seek to maintain and increase their power and money without any regard for others. In an effort to accumulate more money, judges in Ammonihah increase their caseload by provoking disagreements among the people.

=== Debt in the Book of Mormon ===
Lawyers and judges in the Book of Mormon mostly deal with cases of debt. The narrative says that people who are unwilling to pay their debts are forced to pay, accused of theft, stripped of their clothing, or exiled.

== See also ==
- Anachronisms in the Book of Mormon
- Fictional currency

== Works cited ==
- Gardner, Brant (2007). Second Witness. Volume 4 Alma. Vol. 4. Greg Kofford Books. ISBN 978-1-58958-044-2. Wikidata Q123118252.
- Couch, Robert (2020). "On Zeezrom's Conversion: Rationality, Tradition, and Money". Journal of Book of Mormon Studies. 29: 120–151. doi:10.5406/jbookmormstud2.29.2020.0120. S2CID 254328197 – via Scholarly Publishing Collective.
- Curtis, Susan (1990). "Early Nineteenth-century America and the Book of Mormon". In Vogel, Dan (ed.). The Word of God: Essays on Mormon Scripture. Signature Books. pp. 81–96. ISBN 0941214931.
- Largey, Dennis L.; Arnold, Marilyn; Ball, Terry; Dahl, Larry E.; Parry, Donald; Seely, David R.; Williams, Clyde J., eds. (2003). Book of Mormon Reference Companion. Deseret Book Company. ISBN 1-57345-231-9. Wikidata Q123364479.
- Salleh, Fatimah; Hemming, Margaret (2022). The Book of Mormon for the Least of These Vol 2. Vol. 2. By Common Consent Press. ISBN 978-1-948218-58-0. Wikidata Q123458824.
- Givens, Terryl (2002). By the Hand of Mormon: The American Scripture that Launched a New World Religion. Oxford University Press. ISBN 9780195168884.
- Hardy, Grant, ed. (2023). The Annotated Book of Mormon. Oxford University Press. ISBN 978-0-19-008220-8. OL 46783409M. Wikidata Q122259222.
- Hardy, Grant, ed. (2003). The Book of Mormon: A Reader's Edition. University of Illinois Press. ISBN 0-252-02797-3.
- Howe, Daniel Walker (2007). What Hath God Wrought: The Transformation of America, 1815–1848. Oxford History of the United States. Oxford University Press. ISBN 978-0-19-507894-7.
- Thomas, John Christopher (2016). A Pentecostal Reads the Book of Mormon: A Literary and Theological Introduction. CPT Press. ISBN 978-1-935931-55-3. Wikidata Q123196681.
- Bingman, Margaret (1978). Encyclopedia of the Book of Mormon. Herald House. ISBN 0-8309-0199-X. Wikidata Q123363520.
- Reynolds, George (1888). Story of the Book of Mormon. Jos. Hyrum Parry.
- Skousen, Royal Jon (2004), Analysis of Textual Variants of the Book of Mormon: Alma 21-55, vol. 4, Foundation for Ancient Research and Mormon Studies, Wikidata Q123273088
- Rytting, Paul (1992). "Mosiah_{2}". In Ludlow, Daniel H. (ed.). Encyclopedia of Mormonism. Macmillan. pp. 960–961.
- Stott, G. St. John (Winter 2006). "King Benjamin and the Yeoman Farmer". Dialogue: A Journal of Mormon Thought. 39 (4): 1–26. doi:10.2307/45227212. JSTOR 45227212.
- Takagi, Shinji (2022). "Gold, Silver, and Grain". BYU Studies Quarterly. 61 (2) – via BYU ScholarsArchive.
- Townsend, Colby (Fall 2022). "'The Robe of Righteousness': Exilic and Post-Exilic Isaiah in The Book of Mormon". Dialogue: A Journal of Mormon Thought. 55 (3): 75–106. doi:10.5406/15549399.55.3.03.
