= Zeezrom =

Character in The Book of Mormon

In the Book of Mormon, Zeezrom (/ziˈɛzrəm/) is a Nephite lawyer who, through deceit and money, seeks to gain power among the Nephites through his vocation. Alma the Younger and his missionary companion Amulek teach Zeezrom in Ammonihah. At first he resists, but is ultimately converted to the Nephite religion.

== Narrative in the Book of Mormon ==
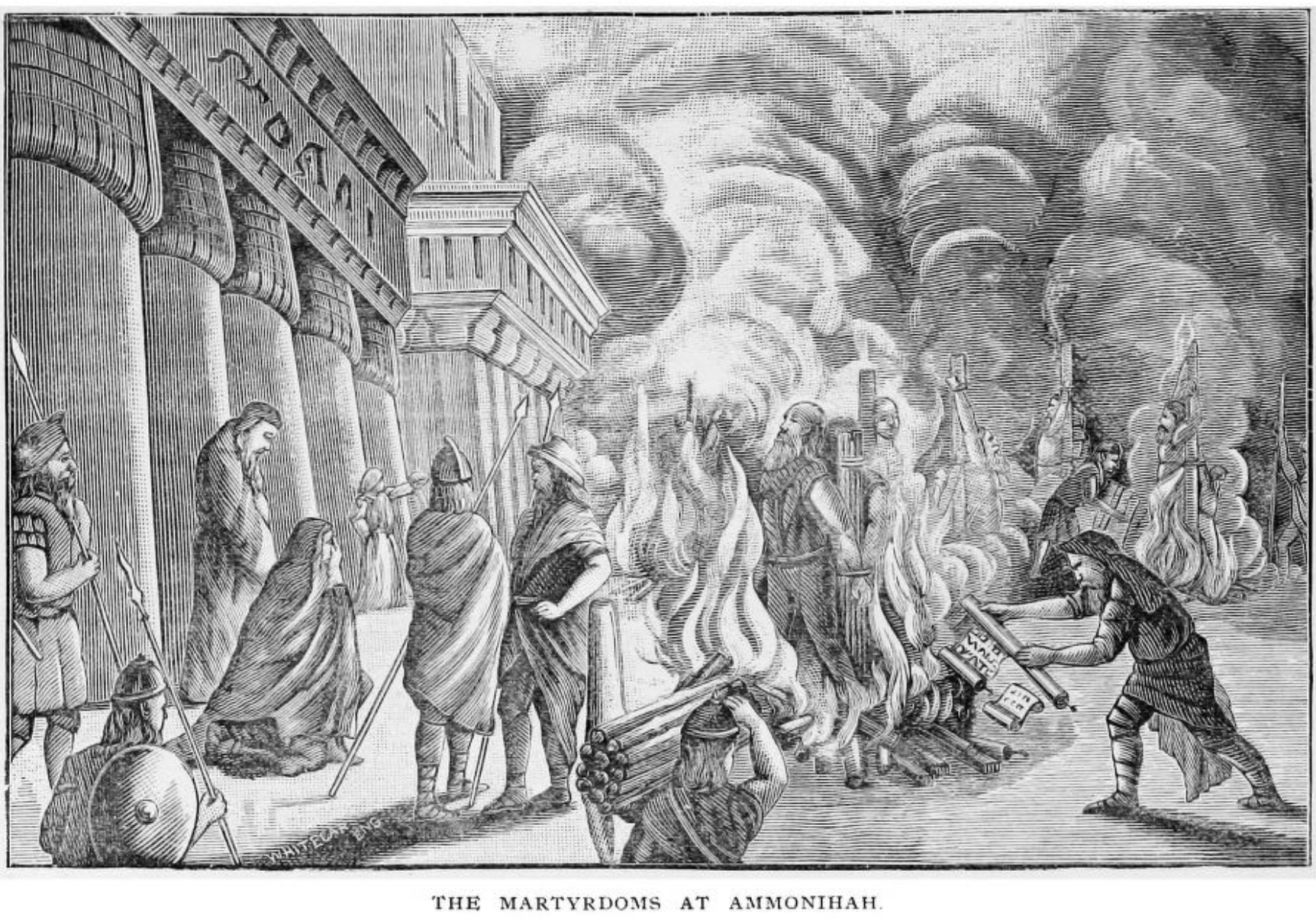
The Martyrdoms at Ammonihah. By John Held, Sr. Ammonihah's leadership cast Zeezrom and other male converts were from the city before killing other believers.

Zeezrom lives in the land of Ammonihah, whose inhabitants participate in wicked deeds. Alma and Amulek try to preach to the people of Ammonihah, but they are countered by Zeezrom. With 42 days' wages (six onties), Zeezrom attempts to bribe Amulek to deny the existence of a God. Among other things, Zeezrom and other lawyers try to convince the people that Alma and Amulek are criticizing the law. The missionaries' words confound him and eventually he is convinced of his misdeeds. Now on the missionaries' side, he attempts to revoke his words; displeased, the people of Ammonihah chase him out of the city with stones before burning the other believers who were converted while listening to the missionaries. He later leaves the practice of law, becoming missionary companions with Alma, Amulek, and others.

== Interpretation ==
=== Law in Ammonihah ===
In the introduction of a book discussing Book of Mormon theology, Latter-day Saint editors Matthew Bowman and Rosemary Demos conclude that the deceptive behavior of Ammonihah's lawyers was connected with the city's poor political and social systems. Judges were paid per case and thus tended to encourage conflict among the people, according to two religious scholars Fatimah Salleh and Margaret Hemming. The chief cases the record describes involved debt, though, according to History and Religious Studies professor Grant Hardy, the judges handled a variety of situations.

Theologist John Thomas also points out that in the narrative the people were influenced by the philosophies of Nehor, a man who thought that fame and money took precedence over honesty. While the missionaries discouraged these philosophies, Zeezrom accused them of rejecting the city's actual laws; there is no evidence in the record that his accusations were founded or correct.

=== Conversion ===
In an article for Journal of Book of Mormon Studies, Pennsylvania State sociology professor Stephen Robert Couch draws upon the work of other researchers in discussing the sophist, or introspective-resistant, ways of Ammonihah's lawyers; in contrast, Alma and Amulek were able to help Zeezrom reflect and recognize his mistakes. Matthew Scott Stenson, a literature professor at Tennessee Tech University, says that the citizens' weakness was rooted in arrogance.

Because the Ammonihahites were angry with Zeezrom for believing the missionaries' words, he sought refuge in Sidom with others who had been driven from Ammonihah. While there, Zeezrom fell deathly ill. The Book of Mormon account attributes the cause to the intense guilt he felt about his past, while Thomas came to the same conclusion when he read the story. Further, Hardy calls it a "psychosomatic illness" caused by his shame.

=== Missionary efforts ===
Zeezrom becomes a very active missionary. He teaches in the land of Melek and joins Alma on his mission to the Zoramites in Antionum. In later times he is held up as one of the key teachers in spreading the Nephite religion, along with Alma and Amulek.

== City of Zeezrom ==
The Lamanites captured the City of Zeezrom in the land of Manti around 66 BC, which was during the years-long war between the Nephites and Lamanites. It took the Nephites five years to handle the invasion, but the Book of Mormon Reference Guide states that the city may have eventually been deserted by the Lamanites.

== Works cited ==
- Largey, Dennis L.; Arnold, Marilyn; Ball, Terry; Dahl, Larry E.; Parry, Donald; Seely, David R.; Williams, Clyde J., eds. (2003). Book of Mormon Reference Companion. Deseret Book Company. ISBN 1-57345-231-9. Wikidata Q123364479.
- Salleh, Fatimah; Hemming, Margaret (2022). The Book of Mormon for the Least of These Vol 2. Vol. 2. By Common Consent Press. ISBN 978-1-948218-58-0. Wikidata Q123458824.
- Hardy, Grant, ed. (2023). The Annotated Book of Mormon. Oxford University Press. ISBN 978-0-19-008220-8. OL 46783409M. Wikidata Q122259222.
- Thomas, John Christopher (2016). A Pentecostal Reads the Book of Mormon: A Literary and Theological Introduction. CPT Press. ISBN 978-1-935931-55-3. Wikidata Q123196681.
- Bingman, Margaret (1978). Encyclopedia of the Book of Mormon. Herald House. ISBN 0-8309-0199-X. Wikidata Q123363520.
