= Amalekites (Book of Mormon) =

Group in the Book of Mormon

The Amalekites (/əˈmæləkaɪts/), in the Book of Mormon, are a group of dissenters from the Nephites around 90 B.C. They are after the order of Nehor and therefore believe that there will not be a Messiah and repentance is unnecessary, so when Nephite missionaries come preach to them, only one Amalekite converts. They also press the Lamanites to war against the Nephites multiple times and participate in the destruction of Ammonihah.

Theories on the origins of the Amalekites vary because they are the only group in the Book of Mormon without an explanation of where they came from. Some scholars suggest that the Amlicites and Amalekites are the same group based on timing and spelling variations in Book of Mormon manuscripts.

== Narration ==
The Amalekites, a group introduced around chapter 21 in the Book of Alma, are first credited with building the city of Jerusalem along with the Lamanites and the Amulonites. They are described as "more wicked and murderous" than the Lamanites and are part of the order of Nehor. They believe everyone will be saved and that there is no Messiah because no human can know the future. The Lamanite king allows them to build places of worship and when Aaron, a Nephite missionary, preaches to them, only one Amalekite is converted.

After another group of Lamanites are converted and become the Anti-Nephi-Lehies, the Amalekites encourage the remaining Lamanites to attack, and they kill around 1,000 of the Anti-Nephi-Lehies, who are unarmed and do not defend themselves. Many of the Lamanites stop fighting and are converted, but the Amalekites continue their attack. After the battle, they swear vengeance on the Nephites and move on to destroy the city of Ammonihah.

In the 18th year of the reign of the judges, as the Lamanites prepare for another battle, their leader Zerahemnah chooses Amalekites and Amulonites as the chief captains in the army because they will inspire the troops to more violence. The Lamanites outnumber the Nephites two to one but are less prepared, and eventually the Nephite captain, Moroni, calls for the Lamanites to give up their weapons and agree not to attack again.

== Interpretation ==
=== Origins ===
Benjamin McMurtry theorizes that the Amalekites may have been Mulekites who believed the Nephites had no right to rule Zarahemla without being descended from the ruling line of Jerusalem, or they were a Nephite group who left the church in Mosiah 26. Scholar Gregory Steven Dundas suggests that this was just one of multiple groups working to bring back the monarchy from before Mosiah's reign.

=== Amalekites and Amlicites ===
Given that the Amlicites disappear after Alma 3 and the Amalekites are the only group in the Book of Mormon without an origin story and there are several spelling differences between manuscripts, many scholars argue that the groups are the same. On the other side, Benjamin McMurtry, however, suggests the spelling similarities between manuscripts are not enough to join the two groups. See Amlicites for an expanded analysis.

== Cultural reception ==
=== Fiction ===
Angi Gibson's book titled Traditions of the Fathers: Save one Amalekite describes the imagined story of the one converted Amalekite from Ammon's teachings to the Amalekites and Lamanites. The Only Amalekite Convert by R.E.D. Richardson also details a potential story of the one convert.

== See also ==
- Nehor for information on the beliefs of the order of Nehor.
- Zoramites

== Works cited ==
- Gardner, Brant (2007). Second Witness. Volume 4 Alma. Vol. 4. Greg Kofford Books. ISBN 978-1-58958-044-2. Wikidata Q123118252.
- Largey, Dennis L.; Arnold, Marilyn; Ball, Terry; Dahl, Larry E.; Parry, Donald; Seely, David R.; Williams, Clyde J., eds. (2003). Book of Mormon Reference Companion. Deseret Book Company. ISBN 1-57345-231-9. Wikidata Q123364479.
- Thomas, John Christopher (2016). A Pentecostal Reads the Book of Mormon: A Literary and Theological Introduction. CPT Press. ISBN 978-1-935931-55-3. Wikidata Q123196681.
