= Coriantumr =

Coriantumr is the name of three figures that appear throughout the narrative of the Book of Mormon:

- Coriantumr (son of Omer)
- Coriantumr (last Jaredite king)
- Coriantumr (Nephite dissenter)
