= Amlicites =

According to the Book of Mormon, the Amlicites (/ˈæmlɪsaɪt/) were a break-off group of Nephites in the Book of Alma, around 87 B.C. Their leader, Amlici, is not chosen by the people as king, so he and the Amlicites leave the Nephites and join the Lamanites. The Nephites win both of their battles with the Amlicites and Alma kills Amlici in the second battle.

The Amlicites also mark themselves on the forehead like the Lamanites, and God marks them with dark skin. Some scholars connect this to a prophecy in Second Nephi about people fighting against the Nephites being cursed with dark skin. Other scholars propose that Amlicites and Amalekites are the same group.

== Narration ==
In the fifth year of the reign of the judges over the Nephites, a man named Amlici wants to become king. He is described as "cunning and wise as to the things of the world", and is part of the order of Nehor, who taught priestcraft among the Nephites and killed Gideon. He gains many followers, who are later called Amlicites, and the Nephites fear that Amlici will take away their religious freedom if he becomes king. They call for a vote, but Amlici is not elected, which leads the Amlicites to split off from the Nephites and make Amlici their king.

Both sides organize for war and the Amlicites attack the Nephites on the east side of the River Sidon. God strengthens the Nephites as they fight, and in the end 12,532 Amlicites and 6,562 Nephites are killed. The Amlicites retreat and scouts are sent to follow them, but the scouts return with the news that the Amlicites have joined a Lamanite army. The Nephite army turns to defend Zarahemla and the two groups meet again at the river Sidon. God strengthens the Nephites again, Alma kills Amlici in a sword fight and the Nephites win a second time. The dead bodies of the Lamanites are then thrown in the river.

At some point, the Amlicites give themselves a red mark on the forehead like the Lamanites. In return, God marks them with the same dark skin the original Lamanites were given to differentiate them from the Nephites. Alma adds that it was also a cultural barrier against intermarriage to keep the Nephites from believing the traditions of the Lamanites.

== Interpretation ==
=== The mark and the Lamanite curse ===
In his book A Pentecostal Reads the Book of Mormon, John Christopher Thomas explains that because the Amlicites mark themselves the same way as the Lamanites, God marks them with dark skin. University of North Carolina professor of history and religious studies Grant Hardy writes of Mormon’s efforts to connect the Amlicites' markings and an earlier prediction of Nephi. As seen in Alma 3, says Paul Y. Hoskisson, BYU professor of ancient scripture, the red mark fits into the Lord’s earlier promise in 2 Nephi 5 of marking anyone fighting against the Nephites. Mormon spends most of Alma 3 describing the curse of the Lamanites and suggests that the Amlicites brought it on themselves with their Lamanite alliance.

=== Amlicites and Amalekites ===
The Encyclopedia of the Book of Mormon from the Community of Christ says that after joining the Lamanites, the Amlicites intermingled and dispersed, unmentioned because they were no longer a separate group.

Several scholars from the Church of Jesus Christ of Latter-day Saints theorize instead that the Amlicites did not disappear as they seem to after Alma 2. J. Christopher Conkling says that Alma spends all of Alma 3, which gives background information on the Amlicites, introducing a problem that will affect the rest of the Book of Alma instead of merely explaining an issue that no longer matters. In Alma 21, the Amalekites are dropped into a sentence without explanation of where they came from. Conkling further describes how no other group is mentioned without explanation in the Book of Mormon and both the Amlicites and the Amalekites were part of the order of Nehor. Additionally, neither group overlaps in time of appearance.

On the spelling difference, John L. Sorenson suggests Amalekite may have been a Lamanite version of the name Amlicite, Professor Royal Skousen used spelling variations in the original manuscripts of the Book of Mormon to extend the idea that they are the same group, showing that Joseph Smith only spelled out new names the first time they came up and his scribe, Oliver Cowdery, wrote both Amlicites and Amalekites multiple different ways.

Alternatively, Benjamin McMurtry claims that these spelling differences are different enough to warrant keeping the two groups separate. He specifically explains the idea using syllables, given that even though Oliver Cowdery spelled both Amlicites and Amalekites multiple different ways, Amlicite always has three syllables and Amalekite always has four.

== Cultural reception ==
=== Paintings ===
Amlici and the Amlicites are depicted in two paintings by artist Minerva Teichert, A Battle at the River Sidon and Alma Overcomes Amlici. The first shows both armies preparing for the attack from either side of the river and the second shows Alma fighting Amlici as other soldiers look on.

== Works cited ==
- Gardner, Brant (2007). Second Witness. Volume 4 Alma. Vol. 4. Greg Kofford Books. ISBN 978-1-58958-044-2. Wikidata Q123118252.
- Conkling, J. Christopher (2005). "Alma's Enemies: The Case of the Lamanites, Amlicites, and Mysterious Amalekites". Journal of Book of Mormon Studies. 14 (1).
- Largey, Dennis L.; Arnold, Marilyn; Ball, Terry; Dahl, Larry E.; Parry, Donald; Seely, David R.; Williams, Clyde J., eds. (2003). Book of Mormon Reference Companion. Deseret Book Company. ISBN 1-57345-231-9. Wikidata Q123364479.
- Hardy, Grant (2010). Understanding the Book of Mormon: A Reader's Guide. Oxford University Press. ISBN 978-0-19-973170-1. OL 24418834M. Wikidata Q123382112.
- Thomas, John Christopher (2016). A Pentecostal Reads the Book of Mormon: A Literary and Theological Introduction. CPT Press. ISBN 978-1-935931-55-3. Wikidata Q123196681.
