= Coriantumr (Nephite dissenter) =

Nephite dissenter and captain of Lamanite armies (Helaman 1)

According to the Book of Mormon, Coriantumr (/ˌkɒriˈæntəmər/) was a Nephite dissenter and Lamanite captain. Coriantumr led the Lamanite armies against the Nephites in an attempt to conquer the land. He was countered by Moronihah and Lehi, eventually dying in battle.

== Coriantumr (dissenter) ==
=== Narrative ===
Coriantumr is the name of a Nephite dissenter who is appointed as a leader over the armies of Lamanite king Tubaloth, son of Ammoron and nephew of Amalickiah. Coriantumr, known as a strong man, leads the armies into battle against the Nephites in approximately 50 BC. Coriantumr is described in chapter one of the book of Helaman as a descendant of Zarahemla, the founder of the City of Zarahemla and leader of the Mulekites at the time Mosiah I finds them. In about 51–50 BC Tubaloth encourages the Lamanites to war against the Nephites after the recent upheaval over the judgement seat between the sons of Pahoran.

Coriantumr arrives with such a large army and so much speed that the Nephites are left totally unprepared. He cuts down the watch at the entrance of the city and marches with his whole army into the city, killing anyone who resists. The chief judge Pacumeni sees this and flees; Coriantumr pursues and kills him against the walls. Coriantumr seeks to gain possession of Zarahelma though a quick march. This risky tactic works, giving him access to Zarahemla's protection and supplies, the first time in the history of Lehi's descendants that Lamanites have captured the capital. After seeing the Nephites fall due to a small number of present military, Coriantumr decides to conquer the entire land beyond only the capital. He and his armies march to the City of Bountiful to conquer the northern cities. Thinking the Nephites are strongest in the center, he leads his armies that way. This tactic ends up benefiting the Nephite commander Moronihah even though many Nephites are slain in the surprise attack. The Nephite army has not been gathered in the center, so they are able to surround the Lamanites, who are. Moronihah does this by sending Lehi, the Nephite commander, to head them off with his armies before they get to Bountiful while he comes up behind. Lehi then routes them from Bountiful; Coriantumr's armies flee back to Zarahemla but are met by Moronihah on the way. A terrible battle ensues, in which the Lamanites are unable to retreat in any direction. Seeing this, the Lamanites surrender after Coriantumr spurs them into the Nephite armies, which gets him killed.

Moronihah then takes back Zarahemla and sends the Lamanite prisoners home in peace.

== See also ==
- Coriantumr (Son of Omer)
- Coriantumr (Last Jaredite King)

== Works cited ==
- Gardner, Brant (2007). Second Witness. Volume 5 Helaman—Third Nephi. Vol. 5. Greg Kofford Books. ISBN 978-1-58958-045-9. Wikidata Q123118002.
- Largey, Dennis L.; Arnold, Marilyn; Ball, Terry; Dahl, Larry E.; Parry, Donald; Seely, David R.; Williams, Clyde J., eds. (2003). Book of Mormon Reference Companion. Deseret Book Company. ISBN 1-57345-231-9. Wikidata Q123364479.
- Hardy, Grant, ed. (2023). The Annotated Book of Mormon. Oxford University Press. ISBN 978-0-19-008220-8. OL 46783409M. Wikidata Q122259222.
- Bingman, Margaret (1978). Encyclopedia of the Book of Mormon. Herald House. ISBN 0-8309-0199-X. Wikidata Q123363520.
