= Aminadab =

Person in the Book of Mormon

Aminadab (/əˈmɪnədæb/) is a person in the Book of Mormon who appears in the Book of Helaman. He had been a member of the Nephite church but left it and became associated with the Lamanites. In the Book of Helaman, after Nephi abdicates the Chief Judgment Seat to Cezoram, he and his brother Lehi go to preach to the Lamanites, who imprison them. After a heavenly incident, Aminadab clarifies to the surrounding Lamanite captors that Nephi and Lehi are conversing with angels.

Latter-day Saint (LDS) commenters on the Book of Mormon write that it is likely that Aminadab was a Zoramite, or a part of the Nephites who elected to follow Zoram. This idea comes from Aminadab saying that he had been taught by Alma, Amulek, and Zeezrom, who taught the Zoramites together earlier in the Book of Mormon. The parallels between Helaman 5 and Alma 34 also support the idea that Aminadab was a Zoramite. In the journal Religious Educator, LDS teachers of seminary and institute invite readers to use the story of Aminadab to show that students sometimes look to their peers rather than their instructors for information, and as an example of someone who left the church but returned to teach the gospel afterwards.

== Narrative in Helaman ==
In the Book of Helaman, the brothers Nephi and Lehi are imprisoned for preaching to the Lamanites. Helaman 5:23 describes them being "encircled about as if by fire". A voice from heaven calls prison guards to repentance. When Nephi and Lehi look upwards and speak, Aminadab explains that they are speaking with angels of God, and encourages the prison guards to repent and cry "unto the voice". After the prison guards "cry unto the voice," the holy spirit fills them and they hear a voice praising his "well beloved".

== Interpretation ==
In A Pentecostal Reads the Book of Mormon, John Thomas cites Aminadab's explanation as evidence that angels converse with humans in the Book of Mormon. In his series Second Witness: Analytical and Contextual Commentary on the Book of Mormon, LDS scholar Brant Gardner writes that Aminadab knew that Nephi and Lehi were speaking with angels because of his Nephite background, even though he himself could not see the angels at this point in the narrative.

Aminadab's name is an alternate spelling of Amminadab, a name found in the Bible as a minor character referred to in the Book of Genesis.

=== Zoramite background ===
In the Journal of Book of Mormon Studies, Michael F. Perry, an LDS lawyer, considers how Aminadab tells his fellow onlookers to "have faith in Christ, who was taught unto you by Alma, and Amulek, and Zeezrom." The only time that Alma, Amulek, and Zeezrom appear together on a mission in the Book of Mormon is when they visit the Zoramites in Alma 31:6. While the Book of Mormon's compiler, Mormon, alludes to many events that are not described in the book, Perry believes that Mormon chose to include the mission that Aminadab references within the text. However, Aminadab's appearance occurs fifty years after this mission in the text. Perry presents the possibility that Aminadab is an older first-generation Zoramite, and concludes that it is not definite that Aminadab referred to the mission of Alma, Amulek, and Zeezrom mentioned earlier in Alma. In The Annotated Book of Mormon, Grant Hardy states that the Nephite dissenters present in Helaman 5, including Aminadab, must have been Zoramites. He noted the parallels of the text in Helaman with the teachings of Alma, Amulek, and Zeezrom in Alma 34 in the questions of "what shall we do?" and the responding advice to "cry unto" the voice.

=== Pedagogical application ===
Writing to an audience of Latter-day Saint (LDS) seminary and institute teachers, John Hilton III, an employee of the Church Educational System, suggested using Aminadab's story as scriptural example of how sometimes students will ask questions about religion to their peers rather than their teachers. Another article in Religious Educator by seminary teacher Daniel J. Prestwich used Aminadab as a scriptural example of an individual who had previously dissented from the church, but "chose to become a missionary" when he taught his fellow onlookers to "cry unto the voice".

== See also ==
- Book of Helaman
- List of Book of Mormon people
