= Gadianton robbers =

Secret society in Book of Mormon

The Gadianton robbers (/ˌɡædiˈæntən/), according to the Book of Mormon, were a secret criminal organization in ancient America. Their use of murder and plunder to destabilize society and overthrow the extant government makes them similar to the Sicarii.

== First incarnation ==
The society was first founded around 52 BC or 51 BC by Nephite supporters of Paanchi, an unsuccessful candidate for chief judge. Paanchi had been executed for treason when he refused to accept the election of his brother Pahoran II to the judgment seat and then tried to incite a revolution. One of his supporters, Kishkumen (/kɪʃˈkuːmən/), assassinated Pahoran in retaliation. Kishkumen and his associates entered into a pact to keep the assassin's identity a secret.

A man, Gadianton, became the leader of Kishkumen's secret group. He arranged for Kishkumen to assassinate Chief Judge Helaman II by promising that if Gadianton were made chief judge, he would appoint the other members of the band to positions of authority. Kishkumen was apprehended and killed by one of Helaman's servants, and Gadianton and his followers, fearing the same fate, fled into the wilderness.

Within 25 years, Gadianton's band had grown into a large criminal organization known as "Gadianton's robbers and murderers", with both Nephites and Lamanites among its members. In 26 BC, the Gadianton robbers assassinated Chief Judge Cezoram and his son.

The Lamanites made every effort to eradicate the Gadianton robbers among them. The Nephites, in contrast, began to join the band in larger and larger numbers until most of them were members. Members swore to protect one another and identified one another by means of secret signs and secret words. By 24 BC, the entire Nephite government was under the control of the Gadiantons.

Around 20 BC, Chief Judge Seezoram was murdered by his brother, Seantum; both of them were members of the Gadianton band. The murder was announced and the culprit identified by Nephi the son of Helaman. Nephi's knowledge of the event was believed by many to be evidence of his prophetic powers. When a famine struck the area a few years later, the people believed that God was behind it, and they reacted by repenting and cracking down on the Gadiantons. The society was completely eradicated, and their secret plans were buried in the earth.

== Second incarnation ==
In 12 BC, a group of disaffected Nephites recovered the secret plans and re-established the Gadianton Robbers. This time, instead of infiltrating mainstream Nephite society, the group established bases in the mountains and the wilderness and periodically raided Nephite and Lamanite cities by guerrilla warfare. This continued to increase their power, and by AD 13, their raids and pilfering had caused so much destruction that the Nephites and Lamanites united and declared war on the Gadiantons.

The Gadiantons initially had the upper hand in the war, and in AD 16, the Gadianton leader, Giddianhi, sent a letter to the Nephite governor Lachoneus demanding surrender. In AD 21, however, the Nephites defeated the Gadiantons, killing both Giddianhi and his successor, Zemnarihah, and the society was again destroyed (3 Nephi 4).

== Third incarnation ==
Around AD 245, a group of Nephites once again resurrected the old oaths and secrets and re-established the Gadianton robbers. Over the course of the next 50 years, they spread all over the land and became extremely wealthy.

The Gadiantons later united with the Lamanites, and the combined force completely wiped out the Nephites.

== See also ==
- Mormon folklore
- Passage to Zarahemla, a fictional portrayal of the Gadiantons
