= Lamoni =

Lamanite king in the Book of Mormon

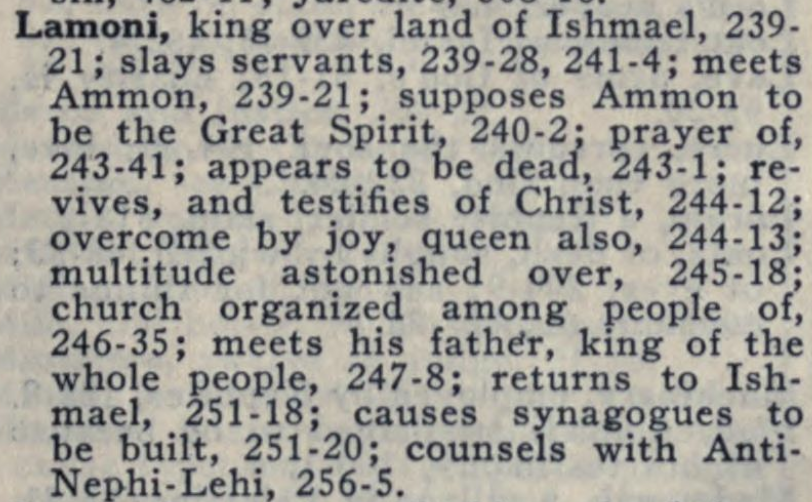
- Index entry in the 1920 edition of the Book of Mormon
- Title: King

Personal life
- Era: Reign of the Judges
- Region: Land of Ishmael

In the Book of Mormon, Lamoni (/ləˈmoʊnaɪ/) is king of the land of Ishmael, part of territory controlled by the Lamanites. Lamoni's father is king over all of the Lamanites. After initially having the Nephite missionary Ammon imprisoned, Lamoni later allows him to be his servant. After Ammon saves some of Lamoni's servants and animals in a seemingly miraculous way. Lamoni then believes that Ammon is the Great Spirit, but learns that he is only a servant of the Great Spirit, or God. After his conversion, Lamoni is traveling with Ammon when he encounters his father. At the peril of his life, Lamoni defends Ammon. Eventually Lamoni helps gain freedom for Ammon and his fellow Nephite missionaries to preach freely in the Lamanite areas.

== Narration ==
The missionary Ammon visits the land of Ishmael where he is captured and taken to King Lamoni, who rules a portion of Lamanite lands. Ammon becomes his servant and protects his flocks from attackers. After the severed arms of the attackers are brought to Lamoni, he asks Ammon about the Great Spirit. Lamoni then learns from Ammon about the gospel and believes him. As he asks the Lord for mercy, Lamoni falls to the ground as if he is dead. Two days later, as they get him ready for burial, the queen calls for Ammon, who tells her Lamoni is not dead. At Ammon's word, the king revives and talks of Jesus, he and the queen are overwhelmed with joy, and they both fall down as if dead. Ammon and all of the witnessing servants go down as well. A woman named Abish who already believes in God touches the queen's hand and she gets up and talks of the gospel. Then she touches Lamoni's hand and he gets up and testifies of what he has learned.

Lamoni wants to bring Ammon to meet his father, the king over all the Lamanites, but Ammon feels directed by God to go release his brothers from prison. Ammon and Lamoni travel to Middoni, but on the way they meet Lamoni's father, who is offended Lamoni missed his feast and additionally that he is traveling with a Nephite. He tells Lamoni to kill Ammon, and tries to kill Lamoni when he refuses. Ammon protects Lamoni, Lamoni's father realizes he can't hurt them, and he gives Lamoni permission to govern his land without any interference. Lamoni proceeds to build places of worship in his land and allows more missionaries to come and preach there.

Lamoni's people, along with other converted Lamanites ruled by his father, become the Anti-Nephi-Lehies.

== Interpretation ==
=== Lamoni's daughter ===
In The Annotated Book of Mormon, Grant Hardy points out that Lamoni may have been politically motivated to offer his daughter as a wife to Ammon. Such a marriage would have been a beneficial alliance if Ammon had revealed to Lamoni that he was the son of a Nephite king.

=== Lamanite faith ===
Fatimah Salleh and Margaret Olsen Hemming point out that while the Lamanites are often described as passing down bad traditions and lacking a relationship with God, the way Lamoni and his wife talk about the Great Spirit implies they have at least limited religion of some sort, as well as knowledge and interaction with God. Specifically, Lamoni and his people have a name they call God and the idea that he punishes bad people.

== Town of Lamoni ==
Lamoni, Iowa, US, was named after the scriptural Lamoni, and was the headquarters of the Community of Christ (formerly the Reorganized Church of Jesus Christ of Latter Day Saints), a separate group from The Church of Jesus Christ of Latter-day Saints based in Salt Lake City, from 1880 to 1920. It was originally named New Buda by Hungarian immigrants, but in 1870, Joseph Smith III renamed the settlement "Lamoni" after him.

== Sources cited ==
- Hardy, Grant, ed. (2023). The Annotated Book of Mormon. Oxford University Press. ISBN 978-0-19-008220-8. OL 46783409M. Wikidata Q122259222.
- Thomas, John Christopher (2016). A Pentecostal Reads the Book of Mormon: A Literary and Theological Introduction. CPT Press. ISBN 978-1-935931-55-3. Wikidata Q123196681.
