= Zoramites =

Group of people in the Book of Mormon

In the Book of Mormon, the Zoramites (/ˈzɔːrəmaɪt/) were one of three major Nephite sects, existing during the administration of Alma the Younger as the High Priest over the Church of God (Alma 4:4). Zoram, the leader of this group, is first mentioned in Alma 30:59 as being the head of a people who "had separated themselves from the Nephites" and was responsible for the death of Korihor.

== Zoram ==
The Book of Mormon describes a time in which the Nephite nation was still recovering from a bloody civil war that had been initiated by the rebellion of Amlici, a follower of the Nehor sect, who, after losing a popular election to be made king, made an alliance with the Lamanites. Therefore, when Zoram settled his people in Antionum near a large body of Lamanites, there grew considerable concern that the Zoramites would make a similar pact and bring about another war (Alma 31:4).

== Alma ==
According to the Book of Mormon, instead of sending armies to destroy the group, Alma attempted to preach to the people to bring them back into the Church of God. Alma's success among a portion of the people, however, sparked the very rebellion that he was seeking to prevent. His converts became refugees in the land of Jershon, where the king of the Ammonites gave them asylum. Because of the Ammonites' refusal to surrender the converts, the Zoramites joined with the Lamanites, and the Amalekites and went to war (Alma 43:4, Alma 43:6). The Nephite armies routed the Zoramites, Amalekites and Lamanites into retreat and finally to surrender.

== Zoramite religion ==
In the Book of Mormon, the Zoramites were Nephite dissenters. After becoming rebellious and prideful they broke away from the Nephite population and created their own community. Alma, fearing that the Zoramites would join forces with the Lamanites and stir them up into anger against the Nephites, decided to go to them and preach repentance. Alma left the Nephites and traveled to the Zoramite city and was surprised by what he found there. Every week the Zoramites would meet at their synagogue to worship their god. One by one, they would get upon a tower, the Rameumptom (Alma 31:21), and say a memorized prayer to God thanking him for making them better than the Nephites and that there was to be no Christ. As they prayed upon the tower, they would hold their hands up toward Heaven. When they finished their prayers, they would continue about their day, not talking about God until they met again the next week.

Alma had little success preaching the Gospel of Jesus Christ among the Zoramites until he came across a group of poor Zoramites who had been expelled from their synagogues because of their poverty. Alma found that they had been humbled by their brethren and were ready to hear the Gospel of Jesus Christ. Alma taught them about faith, prayer, the atonement, humility, and Christ. When the poor Zoramites were converted unto the Lord, they were expelled by the Zoramites and fled to Nephite lands.

The Zoramites are identified as an apostate sect from the true Church of God. The doctrines and practices of the Zoramites are described by Alma as follows:

- The worship of idols (Alma 31:1).
- The rejection of the Law of Moses (Alma 31:9).
- The rejection of church sacraments and daily prayer (Alma 31:10).
- The building of Synagogues for worship once a week on the day of the Lord (Alma 31:12).
- The use of a raised platform for individuals to offer public prayer on the day of the Lord (Alma 31:13, Alma 38:13).
- The rejection of Christ (Alma 31:17, Alma 31:29).
- The belief that the Zoramites are the chosen people of God (Alma 31:18).
- Worship may occur only in a synagogue, and the poor are not allowed to enter (Alma 32:5, Alma 32:9).
- The church is combined with the state and has rulers, priests, and teachers (Alma 35:5).
