= Ammah (Book of Mormon) =

According to the Book of Mormon, Ammah (/ˈæmɑː/) was a Nephite missionary from 1st century BC, and a companion to Aaron. Ammah was part of the missionary delegation to the Lamanites that eventually led to the conversion of the Ammonites. He was imprisoned with Aaron during his ministry.
