= Nehor =

Nehor (/ˈniːhɔːr/) is the founder of an apostate sect mentioned in the Book of Mormon around 90 BC in the first year of the reign of the judges. He teaches the Nephites that priests and teachers should be supported by their followers, and that all will be saved in the end (a teaching compared to Christian universalism). Nehor is brought before Alma the Younger for killing Gideon, a Nephite elder who argued with him. Alma accuses him of priestcraft and sentences him to death for enforcing his beliefs with violence. When executed, Nehor admits to teaching against the word of God.

Later, people of the order of Nehor elect a man named Amlici as their leader, and ally with the Lamanites in war. The people of Ammonihah who imprison Alma and Amulek and kill or exile their followers are adherents of Nehor, as are the Amalekites and Amulonites who defect to the Lamanite city of Jerusalem and join the Lamanites in another war against the Nephites.

According to some scholarly interpretation, the people of Ammonihah, many of whom followed Nehor's teachings, could have rejected Alma because he was previously against the church of God and may have been seen as condemning Nehor for something he did too. Additionally, one scholar thinks the order of Nehor is a broad term for the unbelievers of Alma's time, while another believes the wording suggests other competing orders. Another scholar points out that the stories of Nehor and Korihor provide parallel plot structure to the Book of Alma.

== Narrative in Alma ==
Nehor is presented as a "large and strong man" brought before Alma the Younger, chief judge of the Nephite lands, for killing a man named Gideon and teaching priestcraft, which is when someone preaches for their own personal gain. Contrary to the church of God, Nehor preached the following doctrines:

1. Priests and teachers should be supported by the people and hold a privileged status.
2. There will be a universal salvation for all mankind.
3. There is no need for repentance.

As he goes about teaching, Nehor has an encounter with an elder of the church named Gideon, and kills him. Nehor is then taken to face murder charges before Alma the Younger, high priest of the church of God and chief judge of the land. Alma accuses Nehor of priestcraft, and then sentences him to death for killing Gideon and using a sword to enforce religious beliefs. Nehor admits before his execution that he was teaching against the word of God.

=== The order of Nehor ===
Nehor's teachings continue to affect the Nephites after his death. In Alma 2 and 3, a man named Amlici is introduced as part of the order of Nehor. He wants to be king but loses the election, so his followers, called Amlicites, elect him as their own king. The Amlicites then ally with the Lamanites, and start a civil war resulting in numberless deaths, but they ultimately retreat.

Another group of Nehor's adherents live in Ammonihah, where the chief judge of the city orders the burning of sacred books and the massacre of women and children who believe in the church of God, then imprisons the missionaries Alma and Amulek. The city is subsequently destroyed by the Lamanites and called "the Desolation of Nehors" because most of the people killed are followers of Nehor and the land stays uninhabited afterwards.

Later on, the Book of Mormon talks of a city called Jerusalem, populated by Lamanites and two additional groups of Nephite dissenters, the Amulonites and the Amalekites. Many of these Nephite dissenters are after the order of Nehor, and the Lamanite king allows them to build synagogues according to their beliefs. The king soon converts to the church of God and allows missionaries to teach throughout his lands, but among the Amulonites and Amalekites (followers of Nehor), only one is converted.

== Latter-day Saint interpretation ==
=== Nehorite rejection of Alma ===
Kylie Turley, an English professor at Brigham Young University, suggests that the people of Ammonihah would have been quick to reject Alma if he taught them at all before his conversion. If Alma and Nehor overlapped at all during Alma's time as an unbeliever, the people there may have seen Alma as condemning Nehor for something he himself did in the past.

If Nehor was indeed the founder of a religion which the people of Ammonihah, the Amlicites, and the Amalekites later adhered to, says professor Michael Austin, Alma's difficulty in teaching and converting makes complete sense. He would have been the man who had their religious founder killed, making it a challenge for them to repent or accept his authority as a prophet.

=== Competing orders ===
Turley also says the name Nehor could have been applied beyond his original followers as a label for other nonbelievers of the church of God. In the Book of Mosiah, people with beliefs against the church of God are called unbelievers, but unbelievers in the Book of Alma are always called Nehorites or after the order of Nehor/the order of the Nehors. Based on political problems during the time of the judges in Zarahemla, scholar A. Keith Thompson suggests the order of Nehor was actually a religion of Mulekite ideals named for Nehor because of his commitment and the example he set.

Another scholar, Dr. Avram Shannon, explores the relationship between kingship and priesthood orders in the Book of Mormon and Old Testament. Nehor and Alma both lead orders competing as legitimate; however, Alma compares his authority to that of Melchizedek, a priest and king of the Old Testament. With Melchizedek and his teachings on repentance held up as the paragon of a priesthood order, says Shannon, Nehor's teaching on universal salvation is undermined.

=== Universalism ===
Grant Hardy compares Nehor's teaching that all will be saved at the last day no matter their actions to a common belief from the mid–18th century which was popular during Joseph Smith's lifetime called Universalism, pointing out that almost everywhere else in the Book of Mormon, the belief is that one must obey the commandments and follow Christ to be saved.

=== Connections to Korihor ===
Talking about the structure of the Book of Alma, Brigham Young University religion professor and philosopher Joseph M. Spencer demonstrates the parallel structure between Nehor's story at the beginning and Korihor's later on. Nehor preaches doctrine against the church of God, dies because of his actions, and a later group adhering to his doctrine joins the Lamanites in war against the Nephites. Korihor preaches similar doctrine against the church of God and his death leads directly to the introduction and rebellion of the Zoramites and their subsequent merger with the Lamanites. Both stories end in Lamanite defeat and the bodies of the dead being thrown in the River Sidon.

== Reception ==
=== Literature ===
Latter-day Saint poet Mildred Hunt wrote a series of poems about the Book of Mormon. In her poem "Nehor" she writes from Nehor's perspective, where he ruminates about his teachings and his consequences: "I advocated / That a priest should garnish the Church / And be as a jewel in her crown." Olive McFate Wilkins also wrote a poem about Nehor. In it she explains, "He contended that both priests and teachers / Should not have to work with their hands."

== Works cited ==
- Belnap, Dan (2014). ""And it came to pass...": The Sociopolitical Events in the Book of Mormon Leading to the Eighteenth Year of the Reign of the Judges". Journal of Book of Mormon Studies. 23 (1). JSTOR 10.5406/jbookmormstud2.23.2014.0101.
- Clark, John L. (2002). "Painting Out the Messiah: The Theologies of the Dissidents". Journal of Book of Mormon Studies. 11 (1). JSTOR 10.5406/jbookmormstud.11.1.0016.
- Conkling, J. Christopher (2005). "Alma's Enemies: The Case of the Lamanites, Amlicites, and Mysterious Amalekites". Journal of Book of Mormon Studies. 14 (1). JSTOR 10.5406/jbookmormstud.14.1.0108.
- Hardy, Grant, ed. (2023). The Annotated Book of Mormon. Oxford University Press. ISBN 978-0-19-008220-8. OL 46783409M. Wikidata Q122259222.
- Thomas, John Christopher (2016). A Pentecostal Reads the Book of Mormon: A Literary and Theological Introduction. CPT Press. ISBN 978-1-935931-55-3. Wikidata Q123196681.
- Turley, Kylie (2019). "Alma's Hell: Repentance, Consequence, and the Lake of Fire and Brimstone". Journal of Book of Mormon Studies. 28 (1). JSTOR 10.5406/jbookmormstud2.28.2019.0001.
