= Morianton's maidservant =

Book of Mormon woman spy

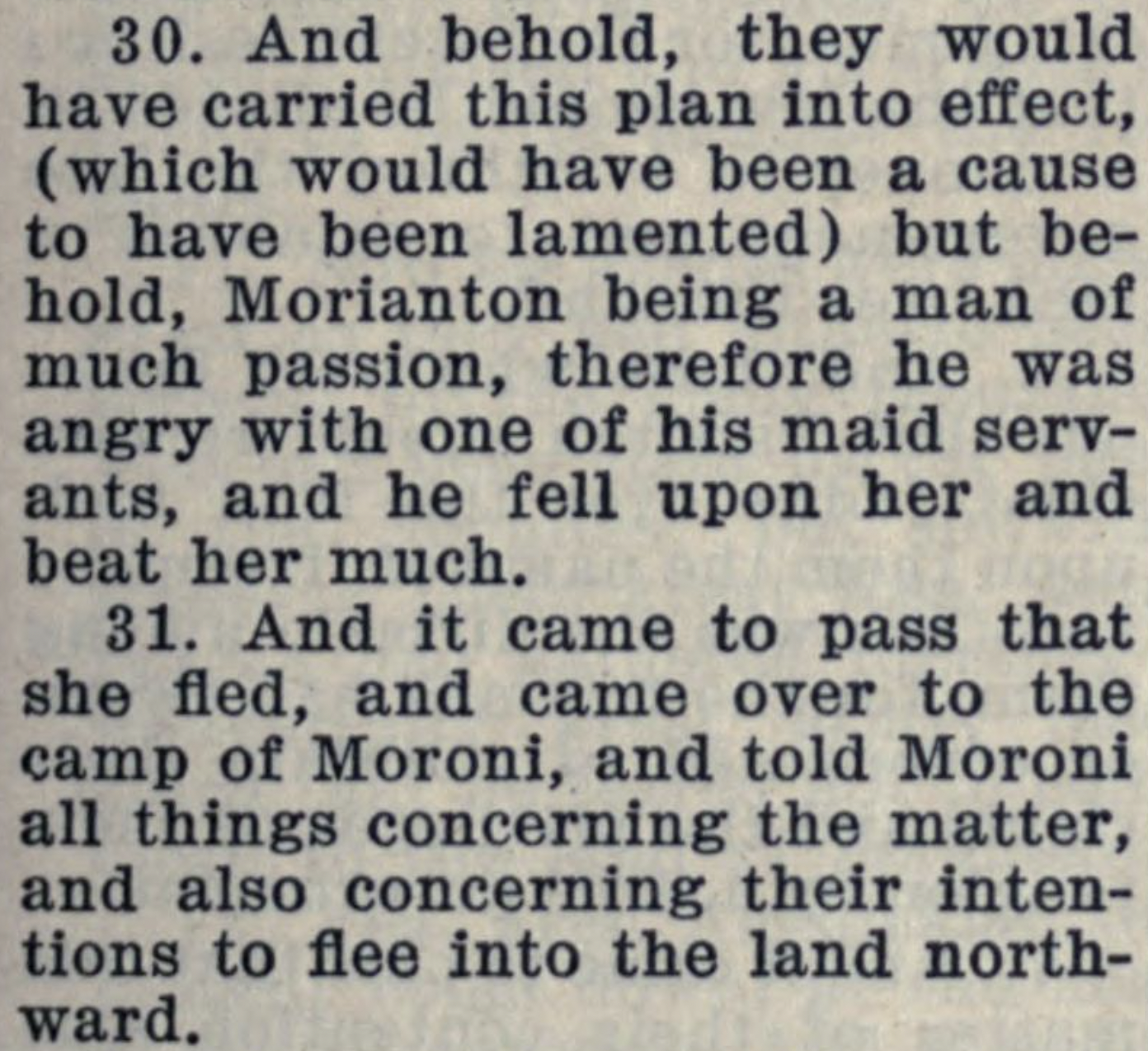
- Appearance in the Book of Mormon (1920 ed.)
- First appearance: Alma 50:30
- Last appearance: Alma 50:31
- Alias: "one of his maid servants"
- Home: Land of Morianton
- Known for: Espionage

Morianton's maidservant is an unnamed woman mentioned in the Book of Mormon, a religious text of the Latter Day Saint Movement. In the Book of Mormon narrative, Morianton is a Nephite insurrectionist. After he cruelly beats his maidservant, she escapes his camp and discloses Morianton's plans to Nephite military leader Captain Moroni. The maidservant's information becomes vital to Moroni's military success against Morianton. A commentary called her becoming a spy as a domestic violence survivor "one of the bravest actions in all of the Book of Mormon".

Morianton's maidservant has been depicted in media works about Book of Mormon content a few times, including in a painting by the artist Minerva Teichert.

== Background ==
In the Book of Mormon, a land dispute emerges between Nephites in the city of Lehi and the land of Morianton, the latter led by a man named Morianton. The inhabitants of Lehi appeal to Nephite military leader Captain Moroni for help. Not prevailing in the dispute, Morianton and his followers become dissenters and make plans to depart from the region and move northward. This threatens to repeat a pattern from earlier in the Book of Mormon in which Nephite dissenters leave Nephite lands only to later return and wage war on their former countrymen.

== Synopsis ==
There appears in Alma 50:30–31 an unnamed female servant of Morianton, called "one of his maid servants". While angry with her, Morianton wrongfully and severely beats her. Retaliating against Morianton, the maidservant escapes his camp and goes to Moroni. Acting as a spy at the risk of her life, she tells Moroni about Morianton's plans to go north. Thanks to the maidservant's espionage, Moroni succeeds against Morianton. When Morianton and his followers flee north, a Nephite army led by Teancum cuts them off. Morianton's maidservant does not appear again in the Book of Mormon.

== Interpretation ==
In a commentary, Fatimah Salleh and Margaret Olsen Hemming call Morianton's maidservant "[t]he hero of this story" and aver that being a "servant, a woman, and a survivor of abuse all put her on one of the lowest levels of the social caste system, making her decision to become a spy one of the bravest actions in all of the Book of Mormon". A feminist scriptural interpretation by Lynn Matthews Anderson describes the account of Morianton's maidservant as one of the only Book of Mormon arcs in which a woman "act[s] in anything other than tightly-defined or constrained circumstances", though Anderson laments that the maidservant nevertheless appears "as a victim of male brutality". Religious studies scholar Grant Hardy interprets the sequence as a "cautionary tale about the consequences of domestic violence". Pentecostal theologian John Christopher Thomas writes that the abuse Morianton's maidservant suffers and her crucial role in Moroni's success both make her a "sympathetic figure" in the Book of Mormon; he argues that "the reader is left wanting to know more about her" because "she disappears from the narrative, receiving neither further mention nor praise for her role".

== Depictions ==
There are relatively few artworks of Morianton's maidservant. American artist Minerva Teichert's Morianton's Maidservant, created around 1949–1951, is an oil on masonite painting measuring 36 by 48 inches. (Note: Art historian Marian Ashby Johnson also calls this painting Morianton's Servant and Morianton's Little Servant.) According to art historian Marian Ashby Johnson, Teichert's use of lighting in the work creates a "strong emphasis" with "firelight as a radiant exclamation point to the girl's message". The painting is displayed in the Joseph Smith Building at Brigham Young University.

Morianton's maidservant appears as a non-player character in the 2015 video game The Servant of Teancum. The player must escort her to Moroni's camp.

== See also ==
- Abish
- Mormon feminism
