= Amulek =

Amulek (/ˈæmjuːlɛk/) is a man referred to in the Book of Alma, a section of the Book of Mormon. After being visited by an angel, he gives food to the prophet Alma, listens to his preaching, and becomes his missionary companion. Alma and Amulek preach in Ammonihah and are challenged by lawyers, primarily Zeezrom, who accuses Amulek of lying and teaching against their laws. They are brought before the chief judge of the land. The men who believe their teachings are thrown out of the city and the women and children are burned in a fire, which Alma and Amulek are made to watch. Then, they are imprisoned until Alma's prayer gives them the strength to break free and the walls of the prison split in two.

Scholars have written a number of observations on Amulek. One points out that he and Alma have similar stories of conversion after seeing an angel. Other scholars suggest Amulek lost his family in the burning of the believers.

== Narrative in Alma ==
Amulek lived around 80 BCE and is mentioned in Alma 8-16, 31, and 34. His teachings and influence are referenced in Helaman 5:10 and Ether 12:13. He is a descendant of Joseph, son of Jacob. Before connecting with Alma, Amulek says he had seen God's power in his life but generally denied it. He then relates his experience traveling to visit a relative and seeing an angel. The angel tells him to go back to Ammonihah and feed a hungry prophet of God, who would in turn bless him and his home.

Shortly after, Alma is returning to the city after previous rejection, meets Amulek, and asks him for something to eat. Amulek recognizes him as the prophet from his vision and reveals himself to be a Nephite, then gives Alma food, later listening to Alma's teachings and going out to preach with him.

The people do not believe Alma has the right to call them to repentance, and become angry, but Amulek begins to share his experience with Alma and God's teachings. He reminds the listeners of his high reputation and connections among them and shares his experience with the angel. The lawyers of Ammonihah try to use Alma and Amulek's own words against them, but Amulek is able to perceive their thoughts. A man named Zeezrom questions Amulek, then claims he taught against their laws, but Amulek proposes that Zeezrom is lying and proceeds to teach him doctrine on resurrection and immortality. Zeezrom also offers him six onties, about 42 days of wages for a judge in Ammonihah, to deny God but Amulek refuses.

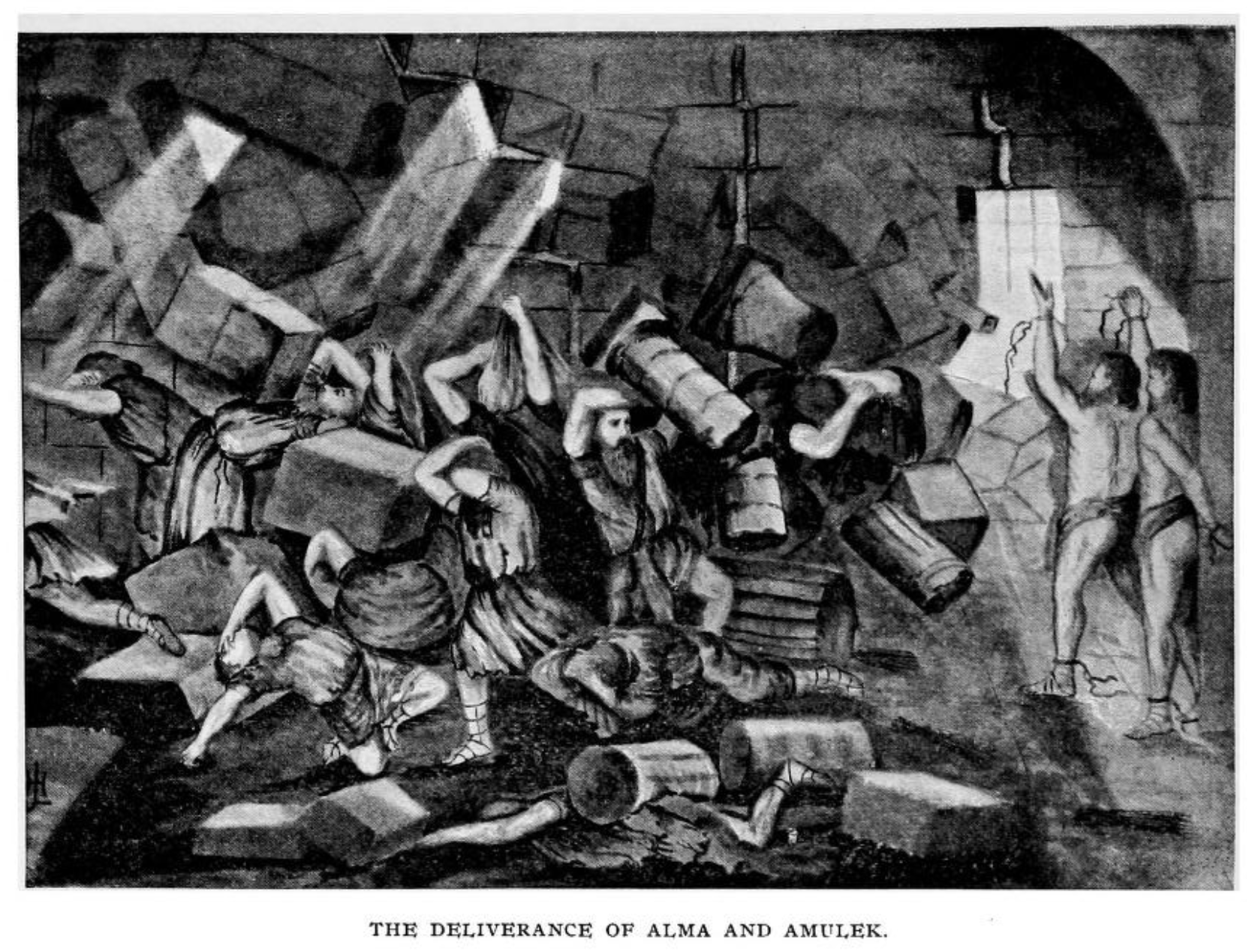
The Deliverance of Alma and Amulek

Following their teaching, many people believe the words of Alma and Amulek, but they are still captured and brought to the chief judge of the land. After strong accusations are brought against them, Zeezrom begins to feel guilty and confesses he lied and they have done nothing wrong. The men who believe Alma and Amulek's words are thrown out of the city, and the two missionaries must watch as the wives and children who believe are thrown into a fire. They are told by the Spirit not to save the people. Subsequently, they are put in prison, beaten, and starved. Alma prays and they are able to break their bonds before an earthquake collapses the prison, striking many people down but leaving Alma and Amulek uninjured.

Amulek also takes part in the later healing of Zeezrom, and in Alma 31, he goes on a mission with Alma and others to preach to a group called the Zoramites. In Alma 34, he teaches of Christ, prayer, and repentance.

== Interpretation ==
=== Conversion ===
Scholar Robert A. Rees points out that Alma and Amulek both had similar conversions in which they rebelled against God, an angel appeared, and they had a change of heart.

=== Amulek's family and promised blessings ===
In The Annotated Book of Mormon, Grant Hardy suggests that Amulek's family was burned with the other believers based on his moving into Alma's house despite previous mention of his women and children in Alma 10:11. Kylie Turley mentions in the Journal of Book of Mormon Studies that Amulek was rejected by his family, friends, and kindred but his women and children are not mentioned there, again pointing to the idea that they died in the fire. She also points out that Amulek was promised a blessing on his family and home, but he later loses almost everything with which he was originally blessed. Turley additionally suggests that Amulek had told the people God would be displeased with them if they cast out the righteous and they proceeded to cast out the male believers and stone them, possibly in direct response to Amulek's words.

=== Literary analysis ===
English scholar and Latter-day Saint Richard Rust proposes Amulek's teachings on prayer in Alma 34 stand out because of his repetition of "cry" and the development from "prayer" to "call", "cry", then "pour out your soul."

== Cultural reception ==
=== Paintings ===
Amulek appears in two paintings from the artist Jorge Cocco called Alma and Amulek and Alma and Amulek in glory. The first depicts them preaching together and the second shows them emerging from the fallen prison. Painter Minerva Teichert also depicted the fall of the prison in her painting The Earthquake.

== Works cited ==
- Hardy, Grant, ed. (2023). The Annotated Book of Mormon. Oxford University Press. ISBN 978-0-19-008220-8. OL 46783409M. Wikidata Q122259222.
- Thomas, John Christopher (2016). A Pentecostal Reads the Book of Mormon: A Literary and Theological Introduction. CPT Press. ISBN 978-1-935931-55-3. Wikidata Q123196681.
- Rees, Robert A (2020). A New Witness to the World. Common Consent Press. ISBN 978-1-948218-35-1.
