= Zedekiah (Book of Mormon) =

Nephite disciple in the Book of Mormon

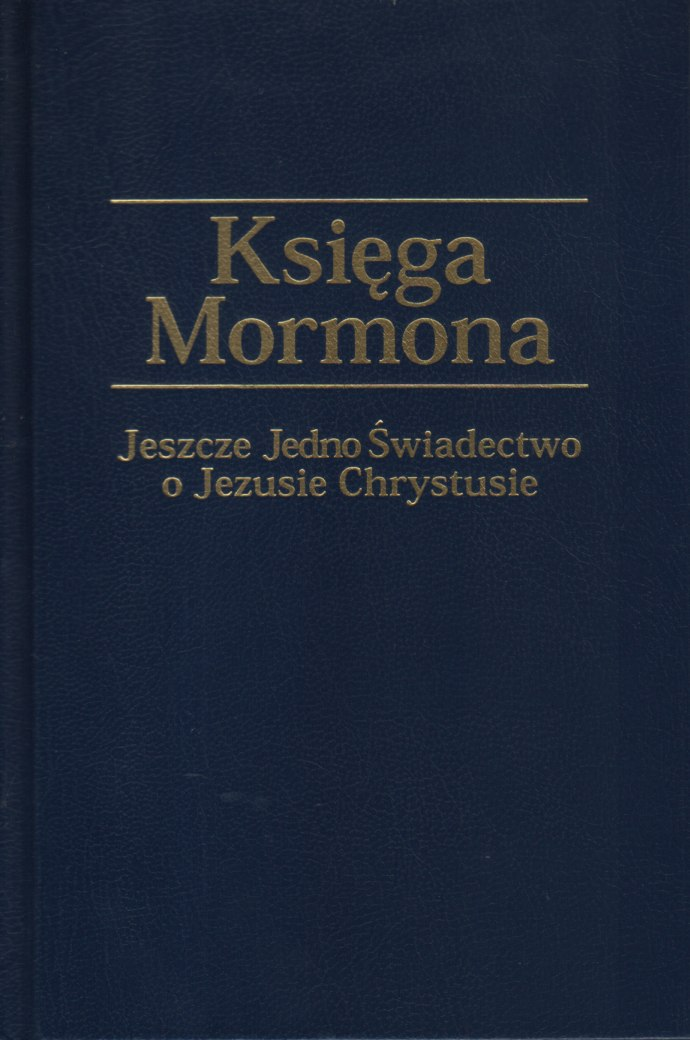
Book of Mormon, a sacred text of the Latter Day Saint movement and the source of references to Zedekiah

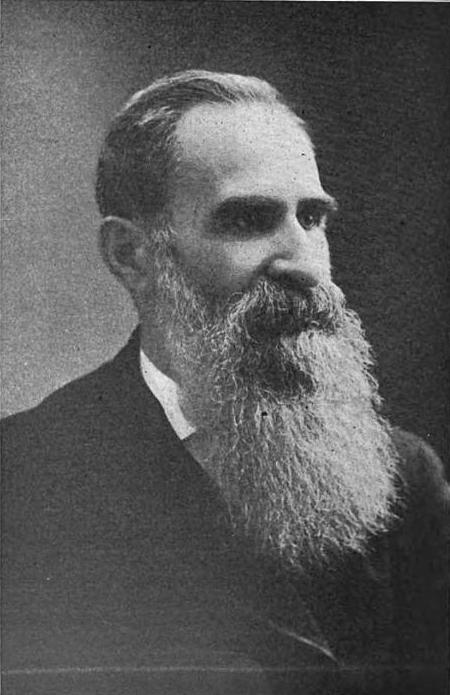
George Reynolds suggested in his work A Dictionary of the Book of Mormon, Comprising Its Biographical, Geographical and Other Proper Names that Zedekiah's ministry impacted both South and North America.

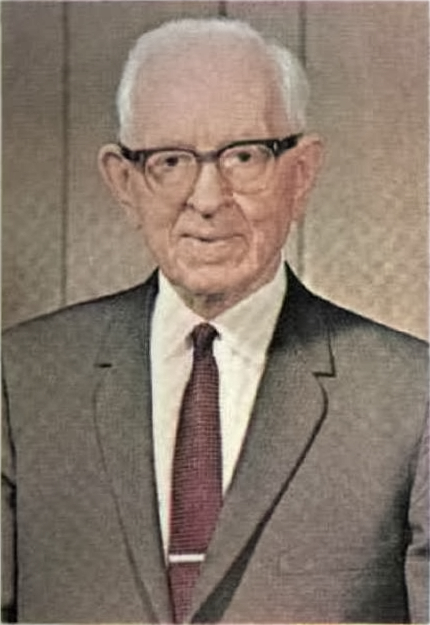
Joseph Fielding Smith, 10th president of The Church of Jesus Christ of Latter-day Saints, analyzed doctrinal aspects of Zedekiah's mission, including his apostolic status.

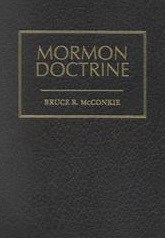
Cover of the second edition of Mormon Doctrine, work by Bruce R. McConkie, which described Zedekiah's ministry as apostolic

Zedekiah (Deseret: 𐐞𐐇𐐔𐐀𐐗𐐌𐐂) is a figure in the Book of Mormon, a key text of the Latter Day Saint movement, described as one of the twelve Nephite disciples chosen during Jesus Christ's appearance to the Nephites. According to the Book of Mormon, Zedekiah was a member of the Nephite Quorum of the Twelve. He taught the Nephites the content of the "Sermon at the Temple" and was baptized by Nephi. He and the other disciples preached to the Nephites. His name appears in academic and critical studies of the Book of Mormon and is sometimes used for children in Latter Day Saint families, including among Māori adherents.

== Pronunciation ==
The pronunciation of Zedekiah's name has been discussed in studies of the Book of Mormon nomenclature. Since 1981, English editions of the Book of Mormon have included a pronunciation guide for names like Zedekiah. However, early records from the Utah Territory colonization show different pronunciations. Joseph Smith's reported pronunciation of Zedekiah, noted in some studies, lacks doctrinal significance in the Latter Day Saint movement. The 1869 Deseret alphabet edition helps scholars study Smith's pronunciation.

Scribes' accounts from the Book of Mormon's translation suggest that Smith spelled out names rather than pronouncing them. Book of Mormon teachings indicate that Nephite names, including Zedekiah's, were not prioritized for precise pronunciation. According to Latter Day Saint belief, these names were not transmitted orally to Smith during the Book of Mormon's translation, with the possible exception of Moroni.

The Book of Mormon states that Zedekiah's name came from the Brass Plates, a record described as containing Israelite writings. The Brass Plates included the Torah, Israelite histories, Lehi's genealogy, and prophecies up to the first chapter of the Book of Jeremiah. Described as written in an Egyptian script rather than Hebrew, the plates' content is sometimes studied alongside the Inspired Version of the Bible, a translation associated with Joseph Smith. The Book of Mormon, translated by Joseph Smith from golden plates in Reformed Egyptian, does not clarify Zedekiah's pronunciation.

== Location in the Book of Mormon ==
The Book of Mormon describes Zedekiah's role in the Large Plates of Nephi, included in the Plates of Mormon, an abridgment by Mormon of these plates. This section was compiled by Mormon without contributions from Moroni. In English editions since 1981, Zedekiah is explicitly named only in 3 Nephi 19:4. The modern chapter-and-verse system was established in 1879. In the 1830 first edition, this reference appeared in chapter nine of 3 Nephi.

Zedekiah appears indirectly in other chapters of 3 Nephi as one of the Nephite Twelve Disciples, as well as in Moroni 2:1–3 and the introductory sections of 4 Nephi.

== Role in Christ's visit to the Americas ==
According to the Book of Mormon, Zedekiah was one of the twelve disciples chosen by Jesus Christ during his visit to the Americas. Most details about his role appear in passages describing the Nephite Twelve Disciples. The text indicates that Zedekiah's selection as a disciple occurred during Christ's initial appearance to the Nephites. The Book of Mormon states that he was authorized to baptize and assist in leading the Nephite community. According to the book, Zedekiah taught Christ's message, known as the Sermon at the Temple, to the Nephites.

The book describes Zedekiah and other disciples as baptized by Nephi and praying for the Holy Spirit. The scripture describes Zedekiah and the disciples experiencing a spiritual manifestation after their baptism, followed by a blessing alongside Nephite children.

The Book of Mormon recounts Jesus appearing to Zedekiah and the disciples, addressing them as friends, noting that they prayed to Jesus during his appearance, rather than to the Father, and continued praying during Jesus' first prayer. Zedekiah and the disciples were described as receiving spiritual blessings during Christ's appearance, and prayed during another of Jesus' prayers. The text portrays them administering the sacrament to the Nephites.

According to the book, Zedekiah and the disciples baptized and blessed Nephites through the laying on of hands, likely teaching in the land of Bountiful. The book states that they gathered before Jesus addressed the church's name, and inquired about their roles.

The text describes Jesus instructing Zedekiah and the disciples to maintain accurate records. Scholars note that the disciples' question about the church's name in the Book of Mormon reflects theological concerns in the Book of Mormon.

== Further ministry ==
In the Book of Mormon, Zedekiah and the other Nephite disciples continued teaching after Christ's appearance. George Reynolds stated in his 1891 work A Dictionary of the Book of Mormon that "in a short time every soul on both [American] continents accepted the message they bore". However, modern Latter Day Saint doctrine clarifies that Book of Mormon events occurred in the Americas without specifying their geographic extent.

== Death ==
The Book of Mormon indicates that some disciples, which may have included Zedekiah, were promised an extended ministry. Some scholars suggest that the last disciple died between 79 and 100 CE. It is uncertain whether Zedekiah was one of the Three Nephites, whose identities are described as unknown. The Book of Mormon states that the Three Nephites were granted an extended ministry, though Zedekiah's inclusion is not specified.

Some historical Latter Day Saint accounts suggest Zedekiah's inclusion among the Three Nephites. Oliver B. Huntington wrote in his diary on 16 February 1895 that "the names of the three Nephites who did not rest in the earth are Jeremiah, Zedekiah, and Kumenonhi", but provided no source.

John Taylor, third president of the church, stated that Zedekiah taught Joseph Smith according to a historical church account.

== Linguistic studies ==
Zedekiah is known solely from the Book of Mormon, with no references in external historical records. The Church of Jesus Christ of Latter-day Saints scholars have studied the etymology of his name, based on biblical names. The name Zedekiah, as used in the Book of Mormon, is linked to the Hebrew name ṣidqîyāhû, meaning "The Lord/Yahweh is [my] righteousness, justice, salvation" or "The righteousness, justice, salvation of the Lord".

== Criticism of the Book of Mormon ==
Zedekiah is discussed in critiques of the Book of Mormon and Mormonism. Dan Vogel compares the Book of Mormon's depiction of Zedekiah's role as a disciple to religious leadership, which he contrasts with the secular political trends during Andrew Jackson's presidency. Vogel further suggests that the book's use of the name Zedekiah, which appears in the Old Testament, reflects Joseph Smith's naming choices, noting its distinctiveness among Nephite names.

== Mormon theology ==
=== Apostolic status ===
The Book of Mormon refers to Zedekiah and his companions as disciples, not apostles. However, Joseph Fielding Smith, 10th president of the church, taught that Zedekiah and other disciples held priesthood authority similar to biblical apostles, per church teachings. Smith noted that they were subordinate to biblical apostolic authority, per church teachings. Bruce R. McConkie, a member of the Quorum of the Twelve, described their ministry as apostolic in his 1966 work Mormon Doctrine.

Sidney B. Sperry cited Moroni 2:1–2 and a 1842 statement by Joseph Smith to support the view that Zedekiah and the disciples held apostolic authority. George Q. Cannon stated in 1869 that Zedekiah and the Nephite disciples were subordinate to biblical apostolic authority, per church doctrine.

=== Rebaptism ===
According to the Book of Mormon, Zedekiah and other disciples were baptized by Nephi, prompting discussion among Latter Day Saint theologians about rebaptism. Sidney B. Sperry taught that Zedekiah's baptism reflected a reorganization of the Nephite church, analogous to early Latter Day Saint practices.

=== Prayer to Christ ===
The Book of Mormon's depiction of a direct prayer to Jesus by Zedekiah and his companions, uncommon in Mormon practice, has been part of theological discussion. Bruce R. McConkie stated that their prayer to Jesus was appropriate given his physical presence, according to church doctrine.

== In Mormon culture ==
Zedekiah appears in Mormon media, including the fourth season of the church-produced Book of Mormon Videos. He is also depicted in the church's Scripture Stories Coloring Book: Book of Mormon for children. The name Zedekiah (sometimes rendered as Terekia) is used among Māori Mormons.

== Bibliography ==
- Largey, Dennis L., ed. (2003). The Book of Mormon Reference Companion. Salt Lake City: Deseret Book. ISBN 978-1-60908-763-0.
- Nyman, Monte S.; Tate Jr., Charles D. (1993). The Book of Mormon: 3 Nephi 9–30, This Is My Gospel. Provo: Religious Studies Center. ISBN 0-8849-4913-3.
- Hyde, Paul Nolan (2015). A Comprehensive Commentary of the Book of 3 Nephi. Orem: Parrish Press.
- Gaskill, Alonzo L. (2015). Miracles of the Book of Mormon: A Guide to the Symbolic Messages. Springville: Cedar Fort Publishing & Media. ISBN 978-1-4621-1685-0.
