= Cezoram =

Book of Mormon chief judge

According to the Book of Mormon, a sacred text of the Latter Day Saint movement, Cezoram (/siːˈzɔːrəm/) was the eighth Nephite chief judge (c. 30 BC). In the 62nd year of the reign of the judges, or 30 BC, Nephi, son of Helaman, gave up the judgement seat and thence devoted himself to spreading the gospel. Four years later, in 26 BC, Cezoram was murdered by the Gadianton robbers. His son replaced him, but was murdered also. After that, the government fell into the hands of those robbers, and it is not known what happened with the judgement-seat until Nephi came back to call the people to repentance. (Cezoram is distinct from the similarly named Gadianton robber Seezoram.)

Preceded by Nephi, son of Helaman	Chief Judge of the Nephites the 62nd–66th years of the reign of the judges, or 30–26 BC	Succeeded by Cezoram's son; eventually Seezoram
