= Marilyn Arnold =

American emeritus professor of English at Brigham Young University

Marilyn Arnold (born November 26, 1935) is an American emeritus professor of English at Brigham Young University (BYU). She served as assistant to President Dallin H. Oaks and as dean of graduate studies.

A native of Salt Lake City, Utah, Arnold received bachelor's and master's degrees from BYU. Arnold also holds a Ph.D. from the University of Wisconsin–Madison. She is a leading scholar on the work of Willa Cather having written among other works A Reader's Companion to the Fiction of Willa Cather and Willa Cather's Short Fiction. Arnold also studied the works of other authors who set their works in the great plains states. Arnold was also closely involved with work relating to poetry. Arnold also wrote on the works of Milton.

Along with Bonnie Ballif-Spanvill and Kristen Tracy, Arnold edited the University of Iowa Press published anthology A Chorus for Peace: A Global Anthology of Poetry by Women.

Arnold has written eight novels including Minding Mama and also Sacred Hymns from the Book of Mormon with Maurine Ozment and Lisa Farr.

Prior to joining the BYU faculty Arnold was a professor at Weber State University.

Arnold has also served as the head of the Center for the Study of Christian Values in Literature at BYU. Arnold is a member of the Church of Jesus Christ of Latter-day Saints.

== Sources ==
- Marilyn Arnold at the MLCA Database
- Deseret Book bio
- Library Thing entry for Arnold
- Association for Mormon Letters listing of Reviews of works by Arnold
- Amazon.com bio
- St. George book festival page with short bio
- Goodreads entry for Arnold
