= Terry B. Ball =

American botanist and Mormon leader

Terry Briggs Ball (born 1955) is an American scholar who served as dean of Religious Education at Brigham Young University (BYU) from 2006 until 2013.

== Biography ==
As a young man, from 1974 to 1976 Ball served as a missionary for the Church of Jesus Christ of Latter-day Saints (LDS Church) in the Japan Kobe Mission. After returning to Utah, he taught Japanese in the Missionary Training Center in Provo until 1979. From 1979 to 1992 he was a Seminary and Institute of Religion teacher and administrator for the Church Educational System in Fort Thomas, Arizona, Mountain Home, Idaho, and at BYU.

In the LDS Church, Ball has served in numerous callings, including as a bishop twice. In 2009 he became president of the BYU 20th Stake. Ball is married to the former DeAnna Hill and they have six children.

Ball holds a bachelor's degree in botany and education (1979), a master's degree in Ancient Near Eastern Studies (1990) and a Ph.D. in archeobotany (1992), all from BYU.

After receiving his doctorate, Ball became a Professor of Ancient Scripture at BYU in 1992. In 2006 he became the Dean of Religious Education. Ball has focused his religious research and publication on the prophet Isaiah and has continued to conduct research in his doctoral field of archaeobotany. He has also taught at BYU's Jerusalem Center.

== Writings ==
Ball has written books including Understanding the Words of Isaiah, and Isaiah and the Book of Mormon. He also has written an entry in the Encyclopedia of Mormonism.

Ball has written several papers related to agriculture and archeobotany. Ball wrote "Agriculture in Lehi's World: Some Textual, Historical, Archaeological, and Botanical Insights" with Wilford M. Hess which was included in the book Glimpses of Lehi's Jerusalem. Ball has applied botanical principles to the understanding of Isaiah.

Ball has written articles for The Journal of Archaeological Science.
