= John Christopher Thomas =

American theologian (born 1955)

John Christopher Thomas (born c. 1955) is a theologian within the Pentecostal movement and the Clarence J. Abbott Professor of Biblical Studies at the Pentecostal Theological Seminary.

Thomas received the B.A. degree from Lee College in 1976, his M.A. from the Church of God School of Theology in 1977, the M.Div. from Ashland Theological Seminary in 1978, a Th.M. from Princeton Theological Seminary in 1979 and a Ph.D. from the University of Sheffield in 1990. Thomas has been a member of the full-time faculty of the Pentecostal Theological Seminary since 1982. Professor Thomas has been honored for his work in New Testament scholarship by election into membership of the Studiorum Novi Testamenti Societas and his appointment as the Clarence J. Abbott Professor of Biblical Studies at the Pentecostal Theological Seminary.

As a New Testament scholar, Thomas' work has been published in the journals New Testament Studies, Novum Testamentum, Zeitschrift fur die neutestamentliche Wissenschaft, and Journal for the Study or the New Testament. He authored a study titled Footwashing in John 13 and the Johannine Community, published a collection of his essays, Ministry and Theology: Studies for the Church and Its Leaders, and wrote a commentary titled The Apocalypse: A Literary and Theological Commentary (2012) and a monograph on healing titled The Devil, Disease, and Deliverance: Origins of Illness in New Testament Thought (2011). Several other books of his include: He Loved Them until the End: The Farewell Materials in the Gospel according to John (2003); The Pentecostal Commentary on 1 John, 2 John, 3 John (2004); and The Spirit of the New Testament (2005).

Thomas serves as editor-in-chief of the Journal of Pentecostal Theology and Supplement Series, and serves as General Editor of the Pentecostal Commentary Series. He is also associate director of the Centre for Pentecostal and Charismatic Studies, Bangor University, Wales. In 1992, Ashland Theological Seminary named him Alumnus of the Year. From 1997 to 1998, Thomas served as the president of the Society for Pentecostal Studies.

Thomas has also approached theological and literary study of the Book of Mormon in his 2016 book A Pentecostal Reads the Book of Mormon: A Literary and Theological Introduction.
