= Book of Mormon rulers =

This article is a list of rulers in the Book of Mormon, including kings and chief judges among the Lamanites, Nephites, and Jaredites.

Dates cited below generally accord with those found in the Latter-day Saint scripture index.

== Nephites ==
According to the Book of Mormon the Nephites had kings to begin with, then judges, then a brief period of anarchy, then self-governance, initially organized by Jesus's instructions.

=== Nephite Kings in the Land of Nephi ===
- Nephi^{1}, prophet, founder and king of eponymous Nephite civilization, fourth son of Lehi^{1}. Favored of God, kept own record, abridged father's record. Left Jerusalem, commanded to recover brass plates, smitten by brothers but protected by angel. After failed attempt to purchase plates, encountered drunken Laban, slew him, obtained plates, persuaded Zoram^{1} to join him, returned again for Ishmael^{2} and family. Saw father's dream and vision of future promised land and ministry of Christ. Forbidden to write some parts. When hunting bow broke, used Liahona to obtain food. Commanded to build ship, crossed ocean, quoted Isaiah^{1}, contended with and separated from brothers, passed plates to brother Jacob^{2} before death (c. 600 BC).^{,}
- 2nd Nephi, 3rd Nephi, etc. (Names not given) (c. 540 – 279 BC)

=== Nephite Kings in Zarahemla ===
- Mosiah^{1}, Nephite prophet and king of land of Zarahemla, who had gift of interpretation. Translated stone record of the Mulekites. Father of King Benjamin (c. 200 BC).
- Benjamin, known as King Benjamin, righteous Nephite prophet and king, and father of Mosiah^{2}, Helorum, and Helaman^{1}. Reigned after father, Mosiah^{1}. Drove warring Lamanites from Zarahemla using sword of Laban, received plates from Amaleki^{1}, and established peace. After instructing sons to protect records and conferring kingdom on eldest, addressed people from tower, where he admonished service, industry, and charity to the poor. Taught of Christ (c. 120 BC).
- Mosiah^{2}, Nephite prophet and king, and also seer who could translate by means of interpreters. Eldest son of King Benjamin. He and brothers taught by their father to read writings in their original language. Near end of life, advocated for an end of monarchy and adoption of judges; he was therefore last of Nephite kings. Among accomplishments was establishment of a permanent system of measures. His once wayward sons (Aaron^{3}, Ammon^{3}, Himni, and Omner) converted and become influential missionaries (c. 154–91 BC).

=== Nephite Kings in the Land of Lehi-Nephi ===
The kingdom was a Nephite enclave within Lamanite Territory.

- Zeniff, father of Noah^{3}, grandfather of Limhi, and righteous leader of expedition of Nephites who left Zarahemla to land of Lehi-Nephi (c. 200 BC). Record comprises Mosiah 9 through 22. Sent to spy among Lamanites, covenanted with King Laman^{2} to possess land of Lehi-Nephi. Made king, betrayed by Laman^{2}, and drove out Lamanite invaders before dying (c. 190 BC).
- Noah^{3}, an iniquitous Nephite king, son of Zeniff and father of Limhi. Heavily taxed his people, ordered Abinadi slain, and accused Alma^{1} of sedition. Life was later spared by Gideon, so fled into the wilderness and commanded followers to desert their wives and children. Burned to death (c. 160 BC).
- Limhi, righteous son of Noah^{3}, and third and final Nephite king in land of Lehi-Nephi. While in bondage to Lamanites—and after three unsuccessful rebellions—encountered Ammon^{1} and brethren, learned their good news from Zarahemla, and shared with them record of Zeniff. Invited them to preach to his people, then planned their joint escape on advice of Gideon. Taught and baptized by Alma^{1}, and joined people of king Mosiah^{2}, to whom he gave the 24 gold plates of Jaredite prophet Ether (c. 121 BC).

=== Nephite Judges in the Land of Zarahemla ===
- Alma^{2}, son of Alma^{1}, known as "Alma the Younger". Nephite prophet and first chief judge. After seeking to destroy Church with sons of Mosiah^{2}, saw an angel who struck them dumb. Converted, he taught the people and was later appointed chief judge and high priest. During reign, sentenced Nehor, led Nephite army, slew Amlici, baptized many, mourned wickedness in the church, and resigned judgment seat to Nephihah. Preached in Gideon, Zarahemla, Melek, and Ammonihah, where he was reviled. Angelic visitation brought him to Amulek, with whom he went out to preach. Accused by Zeezrom and questioned by Antionah. The people, angered, sought his death and that of other believers. Imprisoned with Amulek, where their prayers broke prison walls. Healed Zeezrom, continued preaching, and encountered and confronted antichrist Korihor. Advised Moroni^{2} on military strategy. Father of Helaman^{2}, Shiblon, and Corianton. Continued preaching and prophesying until end of his life (c. 100–73 BC).
- Nephihah, second Nephite chief judge. Succeeded Alma^{2} the Younger when Alma^{2} had surrendered judgment seat to him to devote more time to missionary work. Son Pahoran^{1} inherited judgment seat after his death (c. 83–67 BC).
- Pahoran^{1}, steadfast third Nephite chief judge, son of Nephihah. Supported by freemen; opposed by high-born king-men. Democratic vote for liberty gave Moroni^{1} mandate to silence rebel king-men. Corresponded with Moroni^{1} over inability to defend forces of Helaman^{2} and news of insurrection that drove him and supporters from land. Joined defenders to put down rebellions and overcome Lamanite forces. Resumed judgment seat. Father of Pahoran^{2}, Paanchi, Pacumeni, and others (c. 68 BC).
- Pahoran^{2}, fourth Nephite chief judge. Eldest of three sons of Pahoran^{1} that contended for judgment seat. Murdered by invading Gadianton robber Kishkumen (c. 52 BC).
- Pacumeni, fifth Nephite chief judge, son of Pahoran^{1}, brother of Pahoran^{2}, and contender for judgment seat. After assassination of brother by Gadianton robber Kishkumen, acquired judgment seat briefly. Lamanite invader Coriantumr^{3} caught Pacumeni fleeing, killed him at city wall. Helaman^{3} succeeded as chief judge (c. 52 BC).
- Helaman^{3}, sixth Nephite chief judge and eldest son of Helaman^{2}. Received records from Shiblon and was appointed a judge. The plot of Gadianton robber Kishkumen to murder him failed because of the intervention of a servant. Lived righteously and fathered Nephi^{2} and Lehi^{4} (c. 53 BC).
- Nephi^{2}, influential Nephite missionary, seventh Nephite chief judge, son of Helaman^{3} and brother of Lehi^{4}. Resigned as judge to preach, converted 8,000 Lamanites. Imprisoned with brother, protected by angels, prison walls shaken, encircled with fire, converted larger number of Lamanites. Sorrowed over rise of Gadianton band, taught multitude from garden tower, revealed secret murderer of judge Seezoram, praised by voice from heaven, conveyed away from persecutors, invoked famine, baptized converts of Samuel^{2}, continued working miracles, disappeared (c. 45 BC).
- Cezoram, eighth Nephite chief judge, preceded by Nephi^{2}, son of Helaman, and succeeded by his son, and eventually by Seezoram. (Cezoram and Seezoram are two different people and should not be confused with one another) (c. 30 BC).
- Son of Cezoram (unnamed), ninth Nephite judge, murdered on judgment seat, as was his father (c. 26 BC).
- Seezoram, brother of Seantum and member of Gadianton band, tenth known Nephite chief judge, eventually succeeded by Lachoneus^{1}. How and when he began his reign as chief judge is not known; his first appearance in the Book of Mormon was when Nephi^{2}, son of Helaman, prophesied his murder by hand of his brother, Seantum (c. 23 BC).^{,} (Not to be confused with Cezoram, another Nephite chief judge who was assassinated earlier.).
- various judges with no names given (c. 20–? BC)
- Lachoneus^{1}, eleventh known Nephite chief judge, who received a threatening epistle from Giddianhi (the robber leader), then gathered his people and prepared fortifications. Prophesied and called his people to repentance. Appointed Gidgiddoni as commander of Nephites. After battles and ending of a siege, peace ensued (c. AD 1).
- Gidgiddoni, Nephite commander, prophet, and judge appointed by Lachoneus^{1} to lead forces against followers of Gadianton robber Giddianhi. Gidgiddoni refused the people’s petition for offensive campaign, stockpiled weapons, and defeated the robbers when attacked. His campaign established a great peace (c. AD 16–18).
- Lachoneus^{2}, son of Lachoneus^{1}, twelfth known (and last) Nephite chief judge whose people became proud and wicked (c. AD 29–30).

== Lamanites ==
According to the Book of Mormon the Lamanites appear to have had multiple regional kings ruling concurrently.

=== Lamanite Kings in the Land of Lehi-Nephi ===
- Laman^{1}, rebellious eldest son of Lehi^{1} and brother to Lemuel, Sam, Nephi^{1}, Jacob^{2}, and Joseph^{2}. Travelled into the wilderness with his family, murmured against his father and his younger brother Nephi^{1}, failed to obtain brass plates from Laban, smote brothers, stirred up Lemuel and sons of Ishmael^{2} to kill Nephi^{1}, chastised by an angel, and brought generational curse upon own family and followers, who were named Lamanites after him (c. 600 BC).
- Series of unnamed Lamanite kings.
- Laman^{2}, father of Laman^{3}. Deceived Zeniff and stirred up his people against him (c. 200 BC).
- Laman^{3}, son of Laman^{2}, who appointed Amulon to power, then subjugated him (c. 178 BC).
- Amalickiah, Nephite traitor, elder brother of Ammoron, who lead revolt against Helaman^{2}, threatened to drink blood of Moroni^{1}. After poisoning Lehonti and killing king of the Lamanites^{3}, obtained throne and warred with Nephites. Killed by Teancum (c. 70 BC).
- Ammoron, Nephite traitor, brother of Amalickiah and descendant of Zoram, who engaged in angry correspondence with Moroni^{1}. King of the Lamanites after Amalickiah's death, then killed by Teancum (c. 66–61 BC).
- Tubaloth, son of Ammoron. Appointed Coriantumr^{3}, a mighty man and Nephite dissenter, to lead his armies (c. 51 BC).
- Aaron^{4}, king who attacked Mormon^{2} with a larger army, but lost (c. AD 330).

== Significant Jaredite kings ==
- Jared^{2}, founder and righteous first leader of Jaredites. Came from Tower of Babel with brother and friends. Father to Jacom, Gilgah, Mahah, Orihah, and eight daughters. Asked brother to pray that their language not be confounded. After landing in new world, argued against a monarchy, but relented in the face of people's resistance. Record was explicated by Moroni^{2}.
- Complex series of named and unnamed kings, captive or free
- Coriantumr^{2}, last Jaredite king and last Jaredite survivor. Fought Shared and warred against Gilead, Lib^{2}, and Shiz. Lived 9 months with people of Zarahemla (c. 130 BC).

== See also ==
- Jaredite kings
- List of Book of Mormon people
