= List of Book of Mormon groups =

This list is intended as a quick reference for groups of people mentioned in the Book of Mormon.

Some of these groups are not mentioned by name in the Book of Mormon, but these names are used in discussions about the Book of Mormon.

== A ==
- Alma^{1}, People of. One of two groups that split off from Zeniffites.
- Amalekites. Group of Nephite apostates, origin unknown. One of five tertiary groups of Book of Mormon peoples. Aligned with Lamanites. Aided in building city of Jerusalem in land of Nephi. Described as more hardened than Lamanites. After order of Nehor, and contend with Aaron the missionary son of Mosiah II. Stir up Lamanites against people of Anti-Nephi-Lehi. Appointed captains in Lamanite armies due to their murderous dispositions. Described as Nephite dissenters. Usually better armed than Lamanites. Inspire Lamanites to fight. (Not a genealogical term or necessarily a religious term, rather a political term.) Mentioned only in the Book of Alma chapters 21–22, and 43.
- Amalickiahites. Followers of Amalickiah, dissenters from the Nephites. Refuse to covenant and are executed according to the law. Are astonished at Nephite preparation. Referenced only in Alma chapters 46 and 49.
- Amlicites. Nephite faction desiring a king. One of five tertiary groups of Book of Mormon peoples. Followers of Amlici, they consecrate him king. Nephites prepare to war with. They join with Lamanites and are defeated. Mark heads like Lamanites and are in open rebellion against God and cursed. Referenced in Alma chapter 2–3.
- Ammonihahites (/ˌæməˈnaɪhə.aɪt/). Inhabitants of the city of Ammonihah, after order of Nehors, Nephites by politically. The rejection of Alma and slaying of Saints are among their sins. Destruction foretold. Lamanites destroy and people scattered or slain. Referenced in Alma chapters 8–16, and 49.
- Ammonites. The people of Ammon. One of five tertiary groups of Book of Mormon peoples. Also called Anti-Nephi-Lehies.
- Amulon, Children of. First-generation children of Amulon and his brethren who want to be called Nephites. (Implied through Nephite mothers. Contrast Amulonites)
- Amulonites. Descendants and followers of Amulon and the priests of Noah^{3}. One of two groups that split off from Zeniffites. Called more wicked the Lamanites. After order of Nehors, stir up Lamanites. Rebel against Lamanite king and take up arms against Ammonites. Slay believers, and in turn are slain by Nephites. Usurp leadership and persecute Lamanites. Hunted down and slain by Lamanites.
- Anti-Nephi-Lehies One of five tertiary groups of Book of Mormon peoples.

== B ==
- Babylonians

== G ==
- Gadianton robbers. An outlaw group. One of two voluntary associations of people described in the Book of Mormon.
- Gentiles. Non-Jews. Referred to frequently in the Book of Mormon.

== H ==
- Hagoth, People of. A number of ships were said to have gone into the sea westward. This is sometimes linked in Mormon folklore with the Pacific islanders.

== I ==
- Ishmaelites. A genealogical term derived from the families of the sons of Ishmael who aligned themselves after the division in the colony of Lehi with Laman. One of seven secondary groups of Book of Mormon peoples.
- Israelites. Used in the same sense as the Bible.

== J ==
- Jacobites. Descendants and followers of Jacob (see Jacob 1:13; 4 Nephi 1:36), one of seven secondary groups of Book of Mormon peoples.
- Jaredites. Descendants and followers of Jared, one of four primary groups of Book of Mormon peoples.
- Jerusalem, people of. The Jews.
- Jews. Used in same sense as Bible.
- Josephites. Descendants and followers of Joseph (see Jacob 1:13; 4 Nephi 1:36), one of seven secondary groups of Book of Mormon peoples.

== K ==
- King-men. Opponents of Captain Moroni.

== L ==
- Lamanites. Descendants and followers after Laman, one of four primary groups of Book of Mormon peoples.
- Lamanites (proper). First-generation descendants of Laman, and one of seven secondary groups of Book of Mormon peoples.
- Lehites, Children of Lehi. Descendants of Lehi, including both the Lamanites and Nephites.
- Lemuelites. Descendants and followers of Lemuel, one of seven secondary groups of Book of Mormon peoples.

== M ==
- Mulekites (see Zarahemla, people of). Not referenced directly in the Book of Mormon, but a widely used term in LDS theology as a reference to the descendants of Mulek (see Mosiah 25:2; Helaman 6:10)
- Morianton, people of. Led by a man named Morianton, Fought with the people in the land of Lehi. Fled northward, battle with Teancum

== N ==
- Nehor, Order of. One of two voluntary associations of people described in the Book of Mormon.
- Nephi^{1}, People of (Nephites) (proper). First generation descendants of Nephi^{1} and his righteous brothers, as well as of Zoram^{1}. One of seven secondary groups of Book of Mormon peoples.
- Nephites. The later descendants of Nephi^{1}, and those peoples who chose to be called by his name. One of four primary groups of Book of Mormon peoples.

== S ==
- Stripling Warriors

== Z ==
- Zarahemla, people of (see Mulekites). One of four primary groups of Book of Mormon peoples.
- Zeniffites. One of five tertiary groups of Book of Mormon peoples.
- First Zoramites. Descendants of Zoram^{2}. Though of Israel, their tribe distinction is not mentioned as it is with the descendants of Lehi. Counted among the Nephites, and the true believers after the religious/political division after Christ's appearance (see Jacob 1:13; 4 Nephi 1:36), one of seven secondary groups of Book of Mormon peoples.
- Second Zoramites. Followers of the Apostate Zoram^{3} and of a different political group not to be confused with the previously mentioned Zoramites. (Alma chapters 30–31, 35, and 43; 3 Nephi 1:29)

== See also ==
- List of Book of Mormon people
- List of Book of Mormon places
- List of Mormon place names
- List of Book of Mormon prophets
