= Book of Alma =

Book of the Book of Mormon

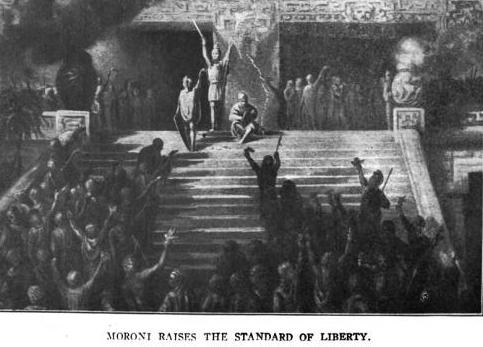
Captain Moroni raises the "Title of Liberty", as found in the 1910 book Cities in the Sun.

The Book of Alma: The Son of Alma (/ˈælmə/), usually referred to as the Book of Alma, is one of the books that make up the Book of Mormon. The title refers to Alma the Younger, a prophet and "chief judge" of the Nephites. Alma is the longest book in the Book of Mormon, consisting of sixty-three chapters and taking up almost one-third of the book's volume.

== Narrative ==
=== Historical outline ===
The Book of Alma is the longest of all the books of the Book of Mormon, consisting of 63 chapters. The book records the first 39 years of what the Nephites termed "the reign of the judges", a period in which the Nephite nation adopted a constitutional theocratic government in which the judicial and executive branches of the government were combined.

The history of the book is outlined as follows:

==== Challenges to the beginning of the republic ====
The first four chapters, describe the rebellions of followers of Nehor and Amlici. Contrary to the dominant lay ministry that existed in the Nephite culture, Nehor established a church that taught universal salvation in which priests were given separate social status and were paid for their ministry. After killing a religious leader during a theological argument, Nehor was tried and executed for his crimes. The followers of Amlici resented the dominant political and religious parties and sought to reestablish the monarchy that the reign of the judges had replaced. Alma, who was chief judge, governor, and high priest over the people of Nephi, led an army against Amlici and his followers and drove the rebellion out of the land.

==== Ministry of Alma among the Nephites ====
Towards the end of chapter four, Alma realizes that the affairs of the Church require his entire concentration. He resigns from his political office and appoints Nephihah as chief judge and governor of the land. Chapters 5–16 record sermons and missionary travels of Alma between 83 and 78 BC. Alma and one of his converted followers, Amulek, provide important teachings about the atonement of Christ, overcoming pride and the natural man, retaining conversion, the resurrection of all men, and judgment day. Later, their teachings about faith and worship in Alma 32-34 are important sources of instruction and insight.

==== Ministry of the sons of Mosiah among the Lamanites ====
Chapters 17 to 27 describe the missionary labors of the sons of King Mosiah II who was the last king over the people of Nephi before the peaceful transition of the nation from a monarchy to a republican form of government. The sons of Mosiah, named Ammon, Aaron, Omner and Himni, chose to devote themselves to missionary labors preaching to the people of the Lamanite nation, which periodically went to war against the Nephite nation. They lived and taught among the Lamanites between the years 91 and 77 BC.

==== Ministry of Alma among the Zoramites ====
Chapters 28 to 35 relate the account of a rebellion of a subgroup of the Nephite nation who called themselves Zoramites. The Zoramites believed in a form of predestination and taught that all others except their people would be damned. Their apostasy from the Church was conspiring against the plans to rebel against the Nephite government. Alma took two of his sons, the sons of Mosiah, Amulek, and Zeezrom on a mission among the Zoramites in an attempt to restore their loyalty to both the Church and the state. Alma and his companions had some success among the poor class of Zoramites who were then exiled from the Zoramite community by the governing rich class of Zoramites. The wealthier Zoramites eventually defected and united with the Lamanites.

==== Commandments of Alma to his children ====
Chapters 36 to 42 record the teachings of Alma to his sons, Helaman, Shiblon, and Corianton. These teachings discuss the ministry and atonement of Jesus, the laws of justice and mercy, the need for repentance, and the resurrection and judgment of all people.

==== Period of war ====
Chapters 43 to 62 record the struggles of the Nephite people during a war against the attacking Lamanite nation between the years of 74 and 57 BC. The Chief Captain (senior military commander) of the Nephites during this time was Captain Moroni. The Nephites were ultimately successful in their defense against the Lamanites.

==== Conclusion ====
Chapter 63 includes concluding historical notes covering the years 56 to 53 BC. This is largely a period of post-war reconstruction and exploration in the Nephite nation.

=== Simple outline ===
This outline is based on main sections and antagonist characters in the Book of Alma. There are two main features in this history, chapters 1 - 42 deal with Missionary Work, and chapters 43 - 63 contain the Wars. The history of the Zoramites provides a transition from Missionary Work to the War chapters of the Book of Alma. The two main sections also mirror the first two antagonist characters, Nehor (religious agenda) and Amlici (political agenda).

- Mission chapters (Alma 1-42)
  - Nehor: rebels against the Church (Alma 1)
  - Amlici: rebels against the Republic (Alma 2)
  - Korihor: the AntiChrist (Alma 30)
- Zoramites (Alma 31 - 43)
  - Zoram: the Apostate Nephites religious (Alma 31)
  - Zerahemnah: the war leader of the Zoramites political (Alma 43)
- War chapters (Alma 43-63)
  - Amalickiah: the man who wants to be king (Alma 46)
  - Ammoron: the vengeful brother of Amalickiah (Alma 52)

== Characters ==
- Alma the Younger
- Gideon
- Nephihah
- Sons of Mosiah
  - Ammon
  - Aaron^{3}
  - Omner
  - Himni
- Amulek
- Zoram^{2}
- Ammon
- Melek
- Lehonti
- Helaman
- Shiblon
- Corianton
- Captain Moroni
- Two thousand stripling warriors
- Teancum
- Laman^{4}
- Gid
- Teomner
- Pahoran
- Moronihah
- Nehor
- Amlici
- Zoram
- Zerahemnah
- Amalickiah
- Morianton
- Ammoron
- King-men
- Gidgiddoni

=== Converts ===
- Zeezrom
- Lamoni
- Anti-Nephi-Lehi

== Notes ==
Book of Alma Contribution of Mormon (Large Plates of Nephi)
Preceded by Mosiah	Book of Mormon	Succeeded by Helaman
