= Liahona (Book of Mormon) =

Object in Book of Mormon

- Book of Mormon element
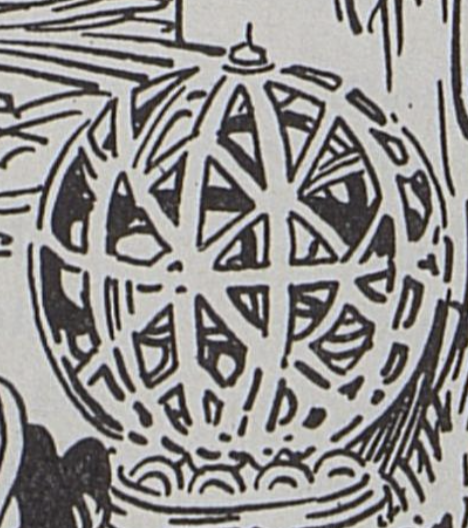
- The Liahona, as depicted in Nephi Returning to the Tents with Food (May 1925)
- First appearance: 1 Nephi 16:10

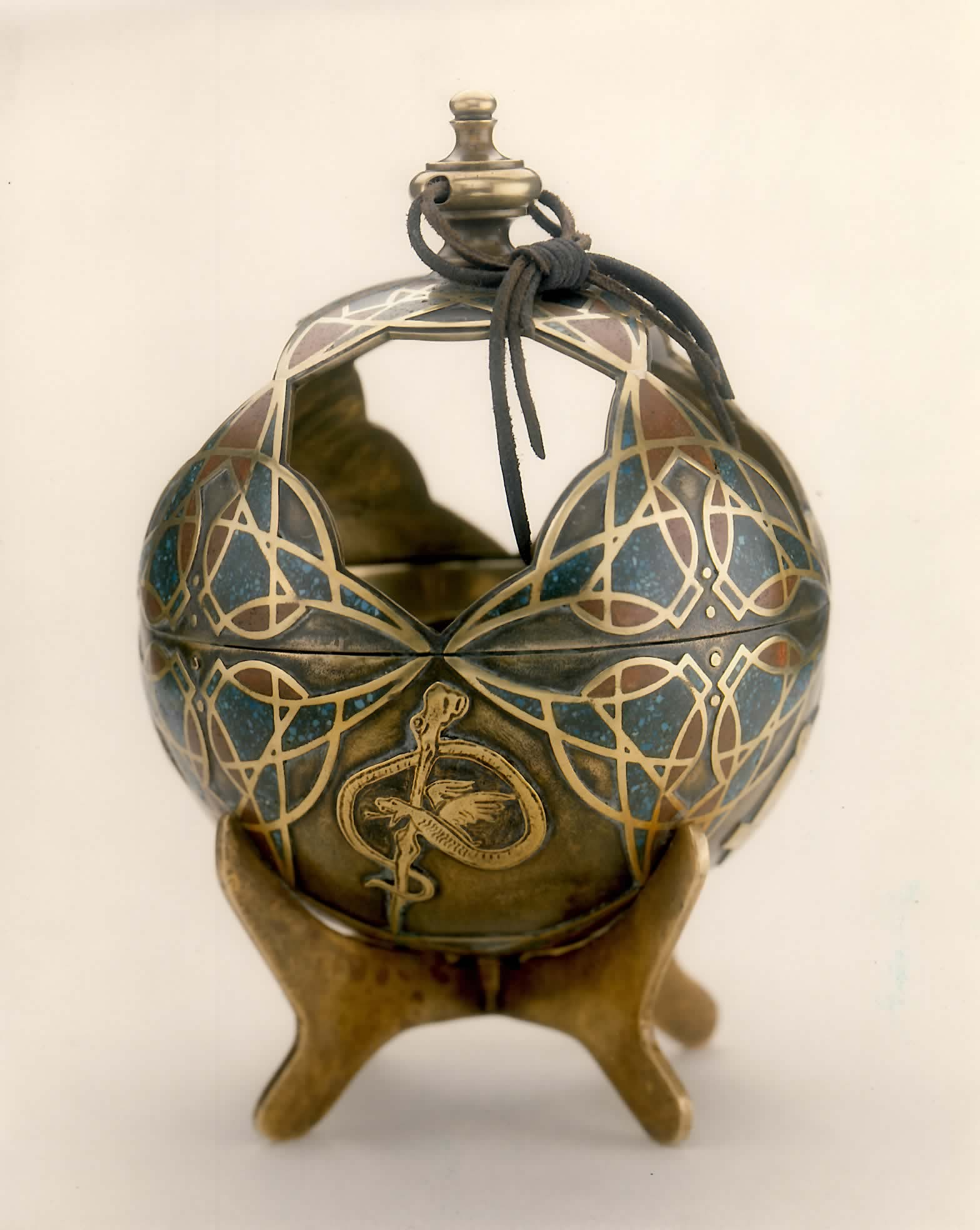
A 21st-century artistic representation of the Liahona

In the Book of Mormon, the Liahona (/ˌliːəˈhoʊnə/) is described as a brass ball with two spindles, one of which directs where Lehi and his companions should travel after they leave Jerusalem at the beginning of the narrative. Some early participants in the Latter Day Saint movement claimed to have seen the Liahona. The Church of Jesus Christ of Latter-day Saints and its members have used the Liahona as a namesake, such as in the name of the magazine the Liahona and in the idea of "Liahona Mormons".

== Background ==
The Book of Mormon, published in 1830, is one of the primary religious texts of Mormonism, also known as the Latter Day Saint movement. Founder Joseph Smith said that an angel of the Christian God directed him to uncover metal plates inscribed with the history of an ancient American people and that by miraculous means he translated the writing on these plates, producing the Book of Mormon. Most in the Latter Day Saint movement regard the Book of Mormon as being genuinely ancient and historical.

== Depiction ==
In the Book of Mormon, a man named Lehi and his family live in Jerusalem prior to the Babylonian captivity. God communicates with Lehi and directs him to lead his family away from Jerusalem. While they camp in the wilderness, the Liahona is found one morning at Lehi's tent door. It is not named as the Liahona at this point. It is described as a "brass ball" of "curious workmanship" with "two spindles", one of which indicate the direction that his party should travel (1 Nephi 16:10). On occasion writing appeared on the ball that displayed additional instructions from God (1 Nephi 16:26-29). Using the Liahona, Lehi and his party travel through a wilderness and across an ocean. The Liahona works "according to the faith and diligence" (1 Nephi 16:28) with which they heed its direction, and ceases functioning at times when the members of the party demonstrate a loss of faith in God's commandments, notably when Nephi's brothers rebelled against Lehi during their ocean crossing (1 Nephi 18:12).

In the Book of Alma, Alma identifies the object as "Liahona" when speaking to his son Helaman, saying, "our fathers called it Liahona, which is, being interpreted, a compass" (Alma 37:38).

== Cultural reception ==
Joseph Smith and three associates—Oliver Cowdery, David Whitmer, and Martin Harris, known as the Three Witnesses to the Book of Mormon—said that God promised to show them the Liahona and did show it to them in what they believed was a miraculous vision. This claimed promise is included in the Doctrine and Covenants, a Mormon religious text that compiles documents that adherents believe to be divine revelations. The Church of Jesus Christ of Latter-day Saints, the largest denomination in the Latter Day Saint movement, named one of its magazines, the Liahona, after the object, referencing its purpose of directing people. A 1967 essay categorized approaches to Latter-day Saints worship as being either like the Iron Rod (another object from the Book of Mormon)—rigid and unambiguous—or like the Liahona, flexible and based on experiencing what Latter-day Saints believe to be revelation. This has been called the "Iron Rod–Liahona scales". The concept of "Liahona Mormons" circulated among Latter-day Saints, and it was acknowledged in the denomination's General Conference.

== See also ==
- Astrolabe
