= Helaman (given name) =

Helaman is the religious leader and soldier from Mormon scripture, and the son of Alma the Younger.

Helaman may also refer to:

- Book of Helaman, called Helaman for short
- Helaman, son of Helaman, aka Helaman II, Nephite prophet who lived around 30 BC
- Helaman (ca 130 BC), a son of King Benjamin
- Helaman Casuga (born 2007), American college football quarterback
- Helaman Ferguson, American sculptor and digital artist
- Helaman Jeffs, American religious official
- Helaman Pratt, American Mormon leader
