= Amalickiah =

Usurper of Lamanite throne in Book of Mormon

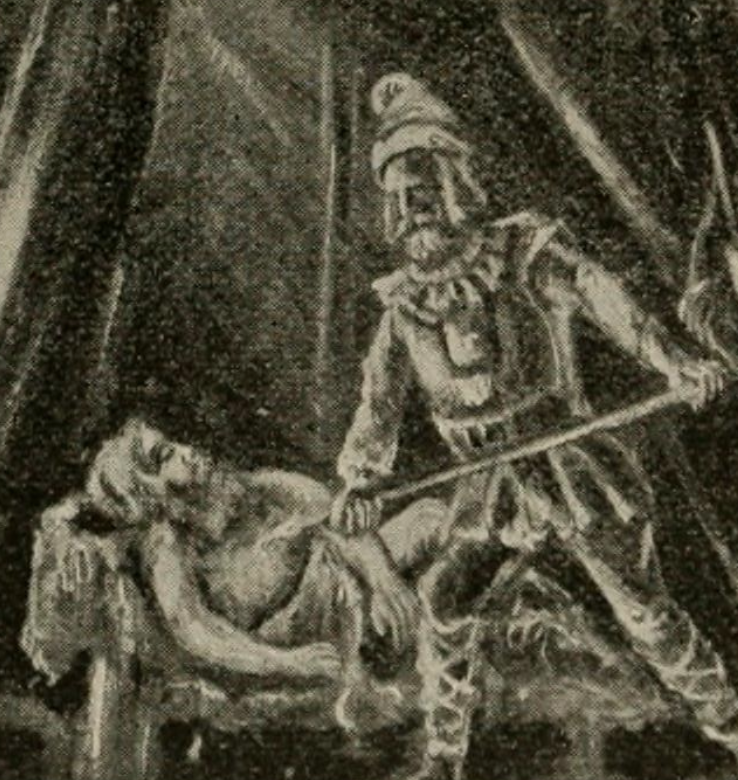
- Amalickiah (left) being stabbed by Teancum (right) in William C. Morris's 1888 Teancum Slays Amalickiah
- First appearance: Alma 46
- Last appearance: Alma 51
- Family: Ammoron (brother)
- Spouse: Queen of the Lamanites

In the Book of Mormon, Amalickiah (/əˌmælɪˈkaɪ.ə/) was a Nephite dissenter. His first appearance in the text is as a political dissident with aspirations to re-establish a monarchy. Later, after seizing the Lamanite throne, Amalickiah led a war to enslave the Nephites. After his death he was succeeded by his brother Ammoron. The story appears in the latter half of the Book of Alma.

Amalickiah has been appraised by some theologians as a narrative mirror to Ammon and as an inversion of other heroes within the Book of Mormon, notably Captain Moroni.

== Narrative in the Book of Mormon ==
=== Initial dissension from the Nephites ===
Following Helaman's ascension to the station of high priest, Amalickiah leads a group of Nephite elites (referred to as Amalickiahites) in a bid to install himself as king over the Nephites. This angers Moroni, the commander of the Nephite armies, who in response lays out the values of the Nephite establishment in the Title of Liberty. After Moroni raises an army to halt the attempted coup, Amalickiah escapes to the land of Nephi, located in Lamanite territory, with a significantly reduced group of supporters.

=== Usurping the Lamanite throne ===
Upon their arrival in the land of Nephi, the Amalickiahites agitate the Lamanites to war against the Nephites. The king of the Lamanites sides with the Nephite dissidents, against the objections of the bulk of his subjects. The Lamanites who do not wish to invade Nephite territory flee to Onidah, where they appoint a new king and leader named Lehonti.

Amalickiah stations his followers in a valley at the base of a mountain where Lehonti and his partisans are encamped. Lehonti spurns three of Amalickiah's attempts at diplomacy, finally acquiescing the fourth time when told to bring his guards and meet Amalickiah, who had ascended almost the entire mountain alone. As they meet, Amalickiah proposes that the two armies combine, with Lehonti in charge and Amalickiah as his second. Amalickiah then arranges to quietly poison Lehonti, seizing control of the unified army. After solidifying his command of the Lamanite military, he marches to the king, who remained in the land of Nephi.

The Lamanite king leaves the city to greet the victorious army, and is promptly killed by Amalickiah's advance party. Before the king's guards can react, Amalickiah's men announce that the king has been murdered by his own guards, who flee under hot pursuit by the Lamanite army. Amalickiah then seduces the Lamanite queen under the pretense of being a war hero and ally of her deceased husband and crowns himself king over the Lamanites.

=== Invasion of Nephite lands ===
After an extensive propaganda campaign, Amalickiah orders an invasion with the stated goal of subjugating the Nephites. The expeditionary force is repulsed by Moroni's innovations in fortifications and defensive tactics. Frustrated, Amalickiah makes an oath to drink Moroni's blood in retaliation and assumes personal command of his army. Under his direction, Lamanite troops occupy seven coastal Nephite cities. Teancum, a Nephite commander, intercepts Amalickiah's army as it attempts a deeper penetration of Nephite territory. After a day long battle, "the two armies [rest] by the sea". Teancum and an unnamed aide then infiltrate the Lamanite camp and Teancum kills Amalickiah in his sleep. This leads to a Lamanite withdrawal and retrenchment, pausing the invasion.

== Textual history ==
In the original manuscript of the Book of Mormon, the first two iteration of Amalickiah are spelled as such, but throughout the remainder of the text Oliver Cowdery, scribing for Joseph Smith's dictation of the Book of Mormon, frequently misspelled the name by replacing the second or third vowels (or both) with the letter e, as in Ameleckiah. This suggests Smith pronounced the name by placing emphasis on the first syllable (rather than the second, as contemporary readers tend).

== Latter-day Saint scholarship ==
=== Death at New Year ===
At least three Latter-day Saint apologists have argued that the timing of Amalickiah's assassination was religiously significant. This idea begins with apologist John L. Sorenson's essay on "Seasonality of Warfare in the Book of Mormon and in Mesoamerica," where he concludes that the first and last months of the Nephite calendar were the primary season for battles and wars in the Book of Mormon. A. Brent Merrill further develops the concept by quoting Sorenson's work on the ritual significance of the New Year while asserting that Teancum's actions were more significant than previously thought in a paper entitled "Nephite Captains and Armies." In a 1991 address to the Foundation for Ancient Research and Mormon Studies, Allen J. Christenson continues this thread of argument by pointing out that the Book of Alma describes the Lamanites' "terror" at the death of their king at the beginning of the New Year. He claims that this was evidence that, like the Maya, "the Lamanites... recognized the importance of the New Year in the renewal of kingship." Christenson, a specialist on Mayan culture, compares this further to Maya preferences to commence combat operations in either the beginning of the New Year or the end of the old one.

=== Leadership studies ===
Several Latter-day Saint scholars have examined Amalickiah as a model of leadership. In a master's thesis, Christopher J. Peterson refers to Amalickiah as a "pseudo-transformational leader" and a case study of "the 'Hitler Problem.'" David L. Rockwood and J. Gordon Daines III, in an article for the academic journal Religious Educator, use Amalickiah and Captain Moroni to develop this theme. Rockwood and Daines conclude that both were presented as highly effective leaders, although they express concern about Amalickiah's predisposition for violence and selfishness. Political scientist Ryan W. Davis, in the Journal of Book of Mormon Studies, concludes that Amalickiah's reign demonstrates that "short conflicts... favor the Lamanite autocracy, but extended conflicts are ultimately won by the Nephite democracy," which fits with the expectations of democratic peace theory. Davis further notes that Amalickiah's apparent disregard for the safety of the Lamanite citizenry matches with the Book of Mormon's negative portrayal of wars of ambition.

=== Literary role ===
According to Latter-day Saint theologian and philosopher Joseph M. Spencer, the structure of the Book of Alma sets Amalickiah up as a narrative mirror to Ammon. These "broad parallels" include that Amalickiah and Ammoron "wished that they were heirs to the throne," whereas Ammon and Aaron "are Nephite heirs to the throne who walk away from power." Spencer also finds evidence for this in that both stories have their turning point in "encounters with a dead (or apparently dead) king," and points out several similar details throughout the Book of Alma.

Amalickiah is also heavily analyzed in The Book of Mormon For the Least of These, a Book of Mormon commentary by Fatimah Salleh and Margaret Olsen Hemmings. Salleh and Olsen Hemmings suggest that an early reference to "Amalickiah's physique" sets him apart as narratively opposed to similarly described heroes (e.g. Nephi, son of Lehi). They further comment on how "his oath to drink the blood of Moroni offers an inversion of covenant-making"; Amalickiah's oath is predicated on violence and is a perversion of the gospel of Jesus Christ as presented in the Book of Mormon. Further, Salleh and Olsen Hemmings consistently find that Amalickiah acts contrary to the interests of his people for personal gain.

=== Proposed etymology ===
The "-iah" suffix can be found in a number of Book of Mormon names such as Mosiah and Sariah, as well as the Biblical names Isaiah, Jeremiah and Zedekiah, where it represents Yah or Jah (Hebrew: יה, Yah), a shortening of the name Yahweh (Jehovah). This short form of the Name of God occurs 50 times in the text of the Hebrew Bible, of which 24 form part of the phrase "Hallelujah", which is actually a two-word phrase, not one word. The preceding syllables resemble the name Amaleki, which according to Hugh Nibley, a prominent Latter-day Saint intellectual and apologist, simply means "my king" in Hebrew. Thus Amalickiah has been proposed to mean "My King is Jah" if it is a Hebrew name.

== Works cited ==
- Salleh, Fatimah; Hemming, Margaret (2022). The Book of Mormon for the Least of These Vol 2. Vol. 2. By Common Consent Press. ISBN 978-1-948218-58-0. Wikidata Q123458824.
- Thomas, John Christopher (2016). A Pentecostal Reads the Book of Mormon: A Literary and Theological Introduction. CPT Press. ISBN 978-1-935931-55-3. Wikidata Q123196681.
- Bingman, Margaret (1978). Encyclopedia of the Book of Mormon. Herald House. ISBN 0-8309-0199-X. Wikidata Q123363520.
- Nibley, Hugh W. (2013). Hummel, Sharman Bookwalter (ed.). Nibley's Commentary On The Book of Mormon: Selections from all Four Volumes, Teachings of the Book of Mormon, by Hugh W. Nibley. Vol. 1. ASIN B00GFY0GUO.
- Skousen, Royal Jon (2004), Analysis of Textual Variants of the Book of Mormon: Alma 21-55, vol. 4, Foundation for Ancient Research and Mormon Studies, Wikidata Q123273088

Preceded by an unspecified Lamanite king	King of the Lamanites the 19th–25th years of the reign of the judges, or 72–66 BC	Succeeded by Ammoron
