= Mosiah =

Mosiah may refer to:

- King Mosiah I, in Mormon literature, king of a tribe of Nephites before 130 BC
- King Mosiah II, in Mormon literature, king of the Nephite nation from about 124 BC to 91 BC
- Book of Mosiah, a book of Book of Mormon, named after King Mosiah II
- Mosiah priority, a theory about the creation of the Book of Mormon
- Sons of Mosiah, the collective name used in the Book of Mormon for the four sons of King Mosiah
- Mosiah (film), 2023 short film
