= Ammoron =

Ammoron should not be confused with Amaron, Ammaron, Amoron, or Moron (Book of Mormon) three other Book of Mormon figures with similar names.

According to the Book of Mormon, Ammoron (/ˈæmɔːrɒn/) was a Nephite traitor. A descendant of Zoram, he succeeded his brother Amalickiah as the king of the Lamanites. Amalickiah, as king, started a major war with the Nephites, which the Nephites had hoped would end with his death. However, Ammoron seized power and continued the war. Eventually his armies were defeated after he was assassinated by Teancum.

== Narration ==
Ammoron is a Nephite turned Lamanite who takes over the Lamanite armies after his brother, King Amalickiah is killed by Teancum. He aims to maintain the cities the Lamanites had already conquered and sustains attacks on Nephite borders. He later writes Moroni to exchange prisoners, who asks for a Nephite man, wife, and their children in return for every Lamanite. Ammoron agrees to the exchange, but promises eternal war against the Nephites for all they have done, which leads Moroni to break the agreement. Ammoron later offers to exchange the city of Antiparah in return for a Nephite named Helaman's Lamanite prisoners, but Helaman asks to exchange prisoners for prisoners, which Ammoron refuses.

The war continues and after one particular battle, several Nephite armies follow and surround the Lamanite army at night. Teancum climbs the city wall, goes tent to tent looking for the king, and throws a javelin through his heart.

== Interpretation ==
=== Antiparah ===
Grant Hardy, professor of history and religious studies, suggests that Ammoron could no longer defend the city of Antiparah and offered it up strategically, but Helaman recognized this and rejected the offer.

=== Identity ===
As described by Fatimah Salleh and Margaret Olsen Hemming, Ammoron shows uncertainty of his identity between Nephite and Lamanite in his letter to Moroni, as he claims Zoram as an ancestor but calls himself a "bold Lamanite". He then uses wording to separate himself from the group of the Nephites while also claiming the war is for the wrongs done against the Lamanites, distancing himself from both groups at the same time.

== Sources cited ==
- Hardy, Grant, ed. (2023). The Annotated Book of Mormon. Oxford University Press. ISBN 978-0-19-008220-8. OL 46783409M. Wikidata Q122259222.
- Hickman, Jared (2022). "The Book of Mormon as Amerindian Apocalypse". In Townsend, Colby (ed.). Envisioning Scripture: Joseph Smith's Revelations in Their Early American Contexts. Signature Books. pp. 269–302. ISBN 978-1-56085-447-0.
- Thomas, John Christopher (2016). A Pentecostal Reads the Book of Mormon: A Literary and Theological Introduction. CPT Press. ISBN 978-1-935931-55-3. Wikidata Q123196681.

Preceded by Amalickiah	King of the Lamanites the 26th–31st years of the reign of the judges, or 66–60 BC	Succeeded by Tubaloth
