= Two thousand stripling warriors =

Army

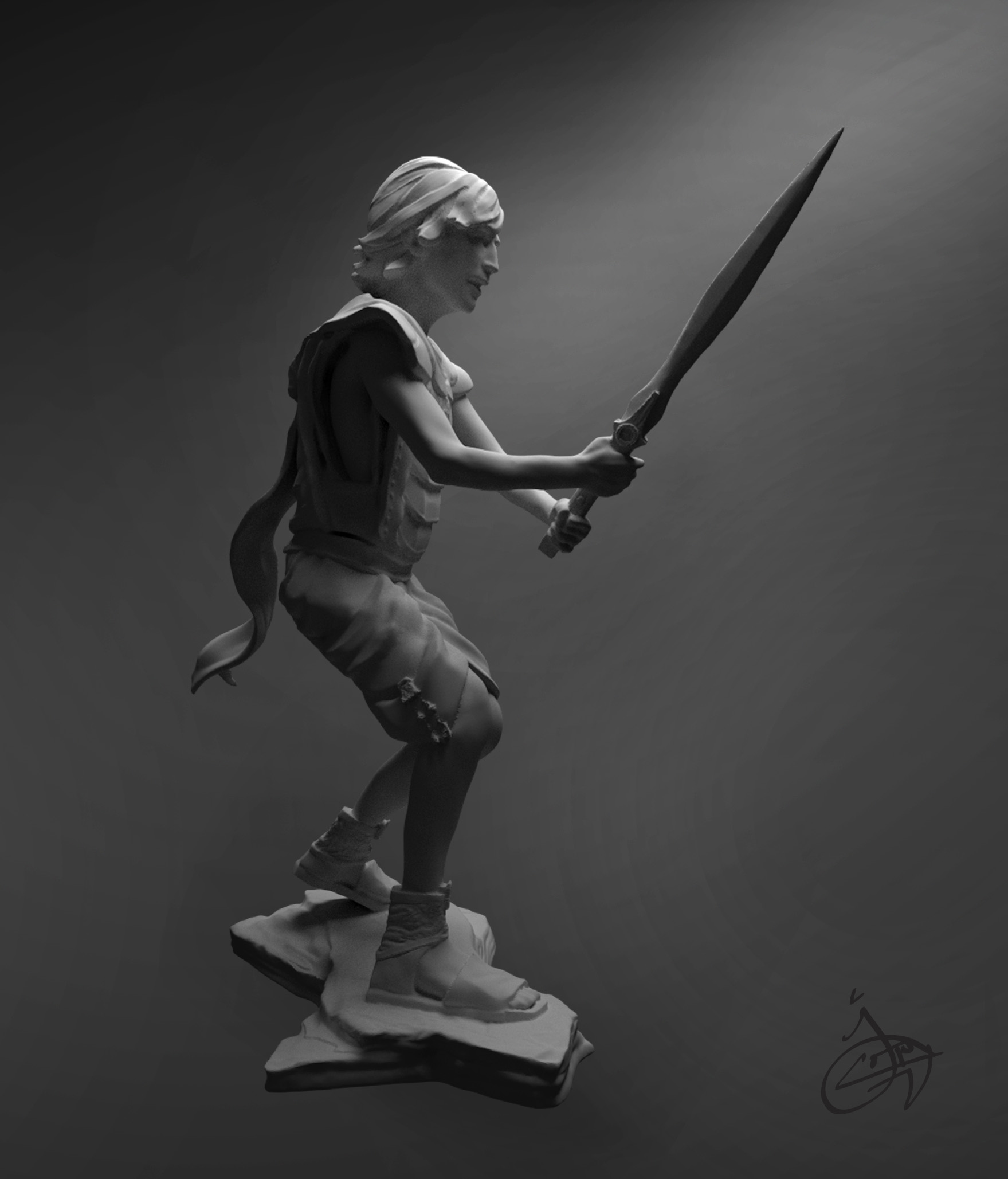
An artist's interpretation of one of the 2060 stripling warriors, also known as the "sons of Helaman"

The two thousand stripling warriors, also known as The Army of Helaman, are an army of young men in the Book of Mormon, first mentioned in the Book of Alma. They are portrayed as extremely valiant and loyal warriors; in the text, all are wounded in battle and yet survive.

== Background ==
Four of the sons of Mosiah, including Ammon, were converted miraculously from rebellious youth into believers. Ammon and his brothers embark on a mission to the land of Nephi, and his converts there lay down their lives during attacks by their brethren, which leads to additional conversions. They refuse to take arms due to their conversion.

The Ammonites (or Anti-Nephi-Lehies) were Lamanites who were converted to Christianity by Ammon, the son of Mosiah. Ammon served a fourteen-year mission among the Lamanites and converted thousands. These people were ferocious and bloodthirsty, and had murdered and plundered not only the Nephites but their own people. Once converted to the gospel of Jesus Christ they buried their weapons of war and covenanted "that they never would use weapons again for the shedding of man’s blood" and "rather than shed the blood of their brethren they would give up their own lives". The remaining unconverted Lamanites began to murder them. When Ammon saw this he moved the Ammonites to a Nephite territory called Jershon so they could be protected by the Nephite army.

== Formation of the unit ==
When war breaks out between the Nephites and Lamanites, the people of Ammon, moved at seeing the Nephites take up arms to defend them and themselves, consider breaking their earlier oath to never take up weapons again. When their spiritual leaders urge them not to do so, instead 2,000 of their sons—who had not sworn their parents' oath—mobilize for the war effort under the leadership of a prophet named Helaman. The Book of Mormon calls these mobilized young men of the people of Ammon "stripling warriors" and "stripling Ammonites". Helaman calls them "my sons", and they are also called "the sons of Helaman". The stripling warriors and Helaman apparently have no prior military experience.

The stripling warriors fight alongside the Nephite army and participate in successful efforts to retake lost Nephite territory. Though every soldier is wounded at one time or another, there are no fatalities among them. Helaman considers this turn of events a miracle owed to the 2,000's great faith, cultivated from the instruction by their mothers.

The original 2,000 "sons of Helaman" are later joined by sixty more, making a total of 2,060.

== Interpretation ==
According to folklorist Spencer Lincoln Green, the stripling warriors are part of a "protected child" motif in the Book of Mormon which holds that children require instruction and shaping from their parents.

== Cultural reception ==
=== Visual media ===
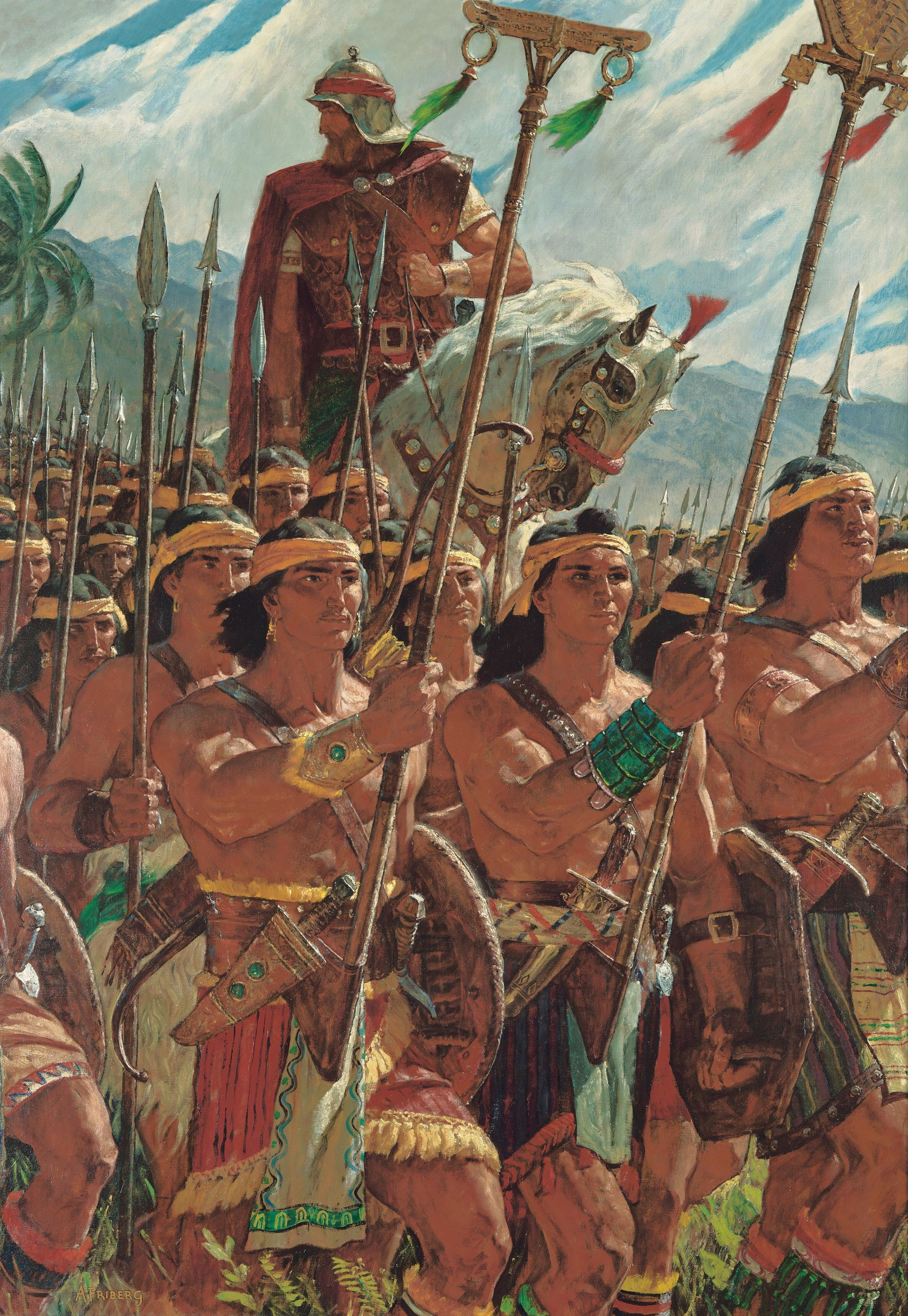
Two Thousand Stripling Warriors

The Church of Jesus Christ of Latter-day Saints' Primary organization in 1950 commissioned American painter Arnold Friberg to produce twelve paintings depicting Book of Mormon content, one of which was Two Thousand Stripling Warriors. The painting portrays the stripling warriors bare-chested, with highly defined musculature, and shows them marching in a unified formation, as if well drilled, armed with spears in a scene archivist Rebekah Westrup calls "[h]ighly militaristic in content and cinematic in form" that emphasizes masculine strength as an indicator of power. Of his Two Thousand Stripling Warriors, Friberg said he imagined the stripling warriors to be like the biblical David, "a splendid young man, athletic".

Between 1949 and 1951, Latter-day Saint artist Minerva Teichert produced an oil painting depicting the stripling warriors, called Helaman's Striplings. in Teichert's painting, the stripling warriors carry shields and wear helmets, breastplates, and pleated skirts that mostly obscure their bodies, and to one side mothers are shown embracing their sons and bidding them goodbye as they depart.

=== Toys ===
In 1996, Latter-day Designs launched a line of Book of Mormon action figures, sold for $4.99 each, which included figures portraying the stripling warriors and their commander, Helaman. According to Deseret Book retail figures reported in 1998, the Helaman figure was among the fastest selling in the line.

Helam: A Stripling Warrior Quest Video Game features blood-free combat with hostile Lamanites as part of a plot to find the antagonist who burned down the protagonist's village.

=== Other ===
In 2010, Utah state attorney general Mark Shurtleff reported that in the Hildale/Colorado City area, a group of boys nicknamed the "Sons of Helaman" spied on the community on behalf of Warren Jeffs, president of the Fundamentalist Church of Jesus Christ of Latter-Day Saints.

== See also ==
- Helaman
- Ammonites
