= Ammonihah =

City mentioned in the Book of Mormon

City of Ammonihah
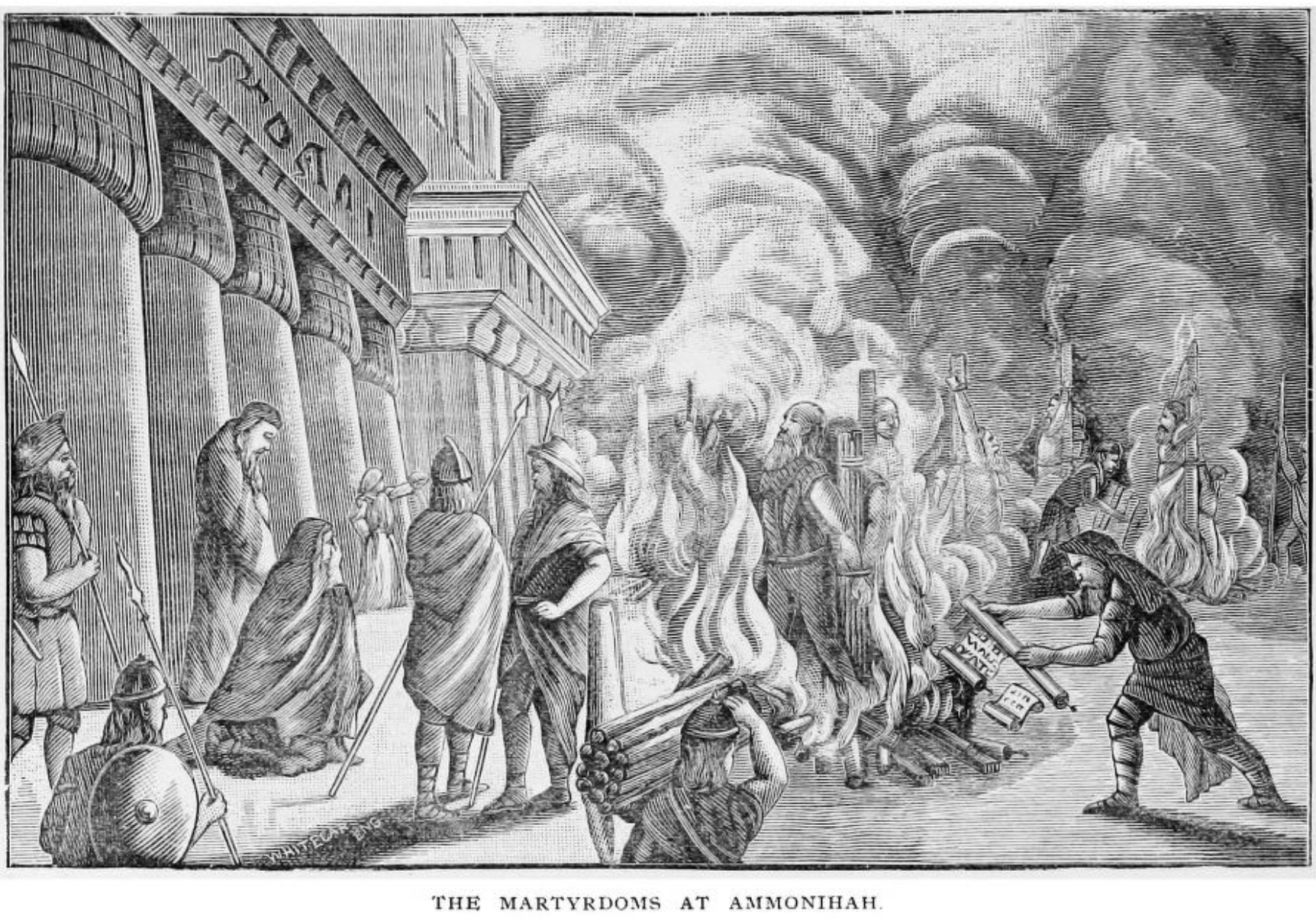
- The Martyrdoms at Ammonihah (John Held Sr., 1888), depicting Alma 14:8, in which those converted by the prophet Alma are "cast into the fire".
- First appearance: Alma 8:6
- Last appearance: Alma 49:15
- Ruled by: Antionah (chief judge)
- Location: Western Nephite lands
- Nickname: Desolation of Nehors

Ammonihah (/ˌæməˈnaɪhɑː/) is a city mentioned in the Book of Mormon, described as governed by lawyers and judges. It plays a central role in the text's narrative about pride, corruption, and divine judgment. When the prophet Alma visits Ammonihah as part of a preaching tour, the city becomes the setting of "one of the most disturbing episodes" in the book: Ammonihah's elite imprison him, exile men converted by his preaching, and burn women and children associated with his mission.

The city's destruction by the Lamanites shortly thereafter is portrayed as divine retribution and serves as a major cautionary episode in the Book of Mormon's spiritual and political themes.

== Background ==
=== Nephite Christian Church ===
There are a few different versions of the Nephite Christian church that exist throughout the story..

=== Book of Mormon ===
The Book of Mormon is the primary religious text of the Latter Day Saint movement. In the book's narrative, a family flees first Temple period Jerusalem, prophetically directed to escape the Babylonian captivity. Led by God, they arrive in the Americas and establish a society which, due to a feud, splits into two: the Nephites and the Lamanites. Despite preceding the birth of Jesus, the Nephites have a society with Christian churches and prophets preaching about Christianity. The majority of the story is framed as the retrospective work of its principal narrator, Mormon, a Nephite who lives near the end of the chronological narrative and reflexively describes creating the text that is the Book of Mormon by abridging and quoting from Nephite history.

=== Book of Alma ===
The Book of Mormon is divided into fifteen internal books, named after prophets in the text in a manner reminiscent of the prophetic books of the Bible. The ninth book is the book of Alma, named after Alma, a prophet whose father founded a Christian church that replaced an earlier version of the Nephites' Christian church established by King Benjamin and King Mosiah in a previous arc. In this book, Mormon narrates Alma's ministry and that of his son Helaman during the "reign of the judges", a period in which rule by judges has replaced monarchy in Nephite society.

The book of Alma structurally divides into four quarters that alternatively parallel each other. In the first and third quarters (Alma 1–16 and 30–44), Alma encounters dissent among Nephites and responds; in the second and fourth quarters (Alma 17–29 and 45–63), Mormon narrates Nephite–Lamanite interactions.

The Ammonihah narrative is framed by an inclusio spanning Alma 9–16. (Note: Inclusio is the "use of the same word or phrase at the end of a passage as appeared at the beginning, thus rounding off or completing it".)

=== Nephite dissenters and Alma ===
Prior to the Ammonihah narrative, the Book of Mormon describes a series of dissident movements in Nephite society whose participants reject the Nephite church's beliefs that everyone needs a Redeemer. The first of these are called "unbelievers", and, at first, Alma is an unbeliever who convinces "many of the people to do after the manner of his iniquities". Alma's life drastically changes when an angel appears and commands him to repent. Alma repents in a way that is reminiscent of Paul the Apostle's conversion in the New Testament, and goes on to become high priest of the Nephite church.

In addition to being high priest of the church, Alma spends some time ruling as chief judge of the Nephites. Early in his career, Alma hears the case of a man named Nehor who, during a debate about religion, murders a Nephite church member. Nehor is also the founder of a new church whose teachings are similar to the ideas of the unbeliever movement. Alma sentences Nehor to death for the murder. Nehor's ideas spread among some Nephites, and Ammonihah is a community that accepts the teachings of Nehor.

== Setting ==
The Book of Mormon describes Ammonihah as a city founded by (and named after) a man also called Ammonihah. Relative to the Nephite capital of Zarahemla, Ammonihah lies beyond the city of Melek, and it is located in the western portion of Nephite territory. As a community, Ammonihah is politically and religiously separated from the rest of Nephite society, as they have their own judges and are followers of Nehor's teachings. A group of judges and lawyers, unique in the Book of Mormon to Ammonihah, (Note: Professor of scripture Dan Belnap calls "the employment of lawyers" an "Ammonihahite innovation" in the setting.) govern the city. The city's residents are called Ammonihahites.

== Narrative ==
=== Ministry ===
The Ammonihah narrative begins in what the Book of Mormon calls the tenth year of the reign of the judges with Alma on a preaching tour throughout Nephite cities after having stepped down as chief judge. Ammonihah is the fourth city he preaches in, after doing so in Zarahemla, Gideon, and Melek. When Alma arrives at Ammonihah, the people refuse to give him an audience, aggressively mock him and the Nephite church, and turn him out from the city, a response to his role in the execution of Nehor. Alma leaves, but once he is outside the city, an angel directs him to return and preach repentance to Ammonihah. The angel warns Alma that Ammonihah is not only doctrinally heterodox but also plotting political sedition, as some "study at this time that they may destroy the liberty of thy people".

Alma's metaphor

"I say unto you then cometh a death, even a second death, which is a spiritual death; then is a time that whosoever dieth in his sins, as to a temporal death, shall also die a spiritual death; yea, he shall die as to things pertaining unto righteousness.

"Then is the time when their torments shall be as a lake of fire and brimstone".

— Alma, Book of Mormon, Alma 12:16–17

When Alma reenters the city, he meets Amulek, a resident of Ammonihah. Having been commanded by an angel to host Alma, Amulek offers Alma food and a place to stay, which Alma accepts. Alma blesses Amulek's home and family, and they begin preaching in Ammonihah as a pair. The Book of Mormon goes on to stress, eight times, Amulek's house as a setting for his hospitality, highlighting by contrast with Amulek's welcoming attitude the inhospitable reception Ammonihah initially gave to Alma.

Ammonihah lawyers and judges confront Alma and Amulek, accusing the pair of trying to undermine the political order. Among these interlocutors are the lawyer Zeezrom and the chief judge Antionah. When Zeezrom addresses Amulek, he foregoes asking questions and attempts to bribe Amulek into denying the existence of God by offering him six onties, or about forty-two days' wages as a judge. Amulek rejects the bribe and retorts that Zeezrom values money more than God.

Alma preaches and engages Ammonihahite lawyers in public debates. In a sermon, he warns that for those who experience "spiritual death" because they do not repent, their "torments shall be as a lake of fire and brimstone, whose flame ascendeth up forever and ever".

Some residents of Ammonihah respond to Alma and Amulek's preaching by repenting and reading the scriptures. Others, however, are outraged, and these eventually seize the pair and imprison them. Alma and Amulek are accused of having "reviled against the law [in Ammonihah], and their lawyers and judges", and threatening to undermine Ammonihah's government. The plot escalates into a mass persecution as Amulek specifically warned the Ammonihahites that God "will come out against you" if they "cast out the righteous". The Ammonihah majority drive male converts to Alma's preaching out of the city, arrest their wives and children, and seized scriptures in their possession.

The chief judge echoes the metaphor

"Now it came to pass that when the bodies of those who had been cast into the fire were consumed, and also the records which were cast in with them, the chief judge of the land came and stood before Alma and Amulek, as they were bound; and he smote them with his hand upon their cheeks, and said unto them: After what ye have seen, will ye preach again unto this people, that they shall be cast into a lake of fire and brimstone?"

— Book of Mormon, Alma 14:14

=== Martyrdoms ===
After gathering scriptures and prisoners, the people of Ammonihah create a fire in which they destroy scriptures and burn women and children alive as an intentional and distorted reference to Alma's sermon. Any who believed Alma and Amulek's teachings or listened to them at all are burned alive. Ammonihahites bring Amulek and Alma to the "place of martyrdom" and force them to watch, and Ammonihah's chief judge asks, "After what ye have seen, will ye preach again unto this people, that they shall be cast into a lake of fire and brimstone?"

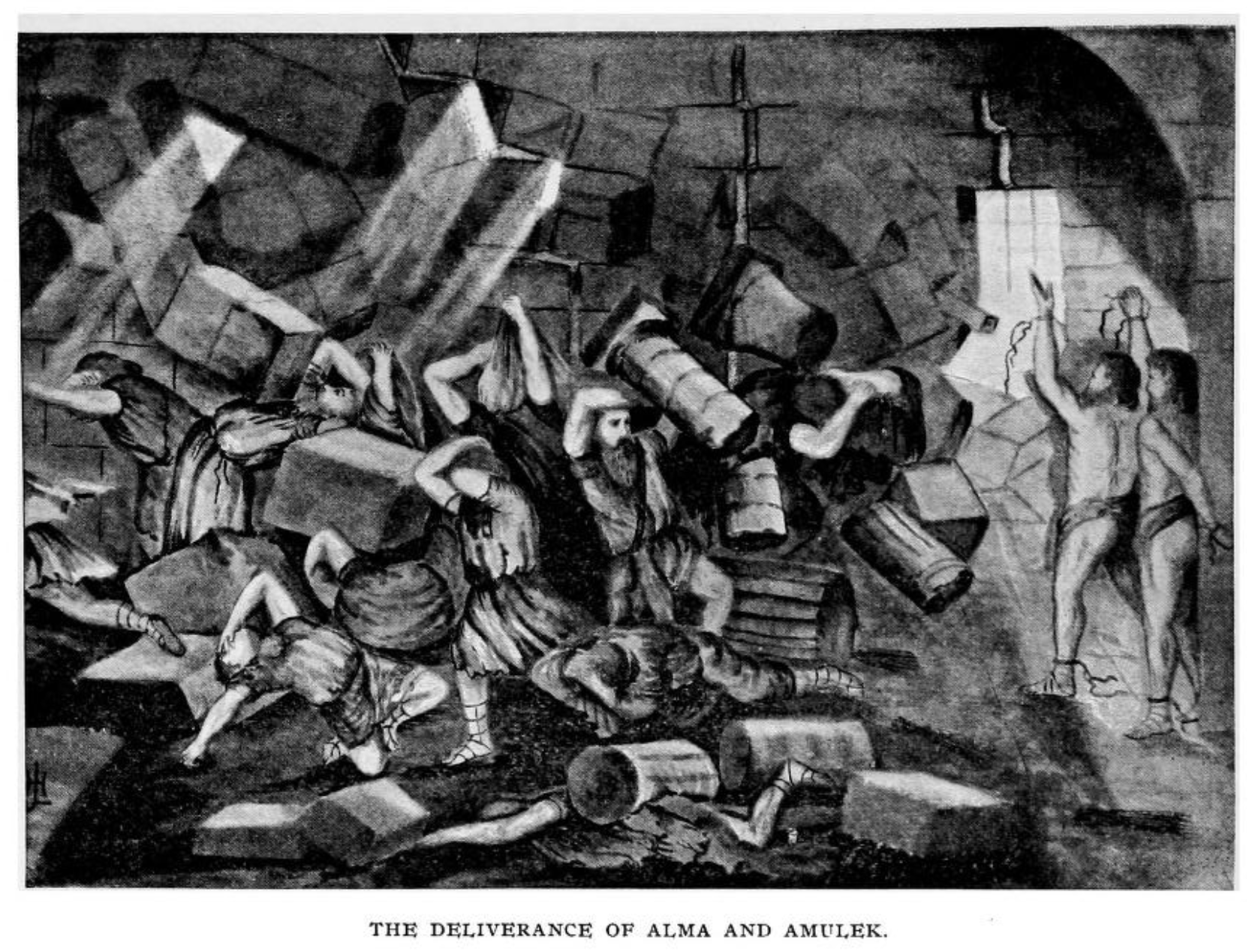
The Deliverance of Alma and Amulek by John Held Sr., 1888, depicting Alma 14:27–28

The people of Ammonihah keep Alma and Amulek imprisoned, and the jailers take away their clothing, mock them, starve them, and beat them. After days spent in this manner, Alma and Amulek finally escape through miraculous deliverance when the prison, in response to a prayer by Alma, spontaneously collapses without harming them, whereupon they leave Ammonihah and reunite with survivors in a place called Sidom. In Sidom, a community of Nephites are sheltering surviving refugees from Ammonihah. This is the first occurrence in the Book of Mormon of a community taking in religious refugees, which goes on to become a recurring trope for the rest of the book.

In Sidom, Alma and Amulek encounter an ailing Zeezrom, who has survived and converted to Alma's religion, and Alma miraculously heals him. Amulek is no longer in possession of any of the wealth he had while living in Ammonihah, and his immediate family is implied to have died in the fires. (Note: Charles Swift and Grant Hardy both note that while the Ammonihah story does not overtly narrate what happens to Amulek's earlier-mentioned family, as written the content implies they die. See their assessments as follows: "What has happened to Amulek's wife and children? The narrator does not speak of them, but apparently Alma and Amulek watch the deaths all of the women and children who are murdered... It is quite possible that his family is martyred before Amulek's eyes, since the wicked people are killing those who were taught as well as those who believed and it is unlikely that his family was not taught when Alma was in their home or when the two taught the crowd"; "Amulek moves into Alma's house alone, even though there was a reference earlier to his wife and children (10.11). If they had been among those burned at Ammonihah... his loss may explain his continuing tribulations".) The story closes with Alma taking Amulek into his home where he "did administer unto him in his tribulations".

=== Aftermath ===
Some time after Alma and Amulek leave Ammonihah, Lamanites attack the city and destroy it. As the narrator of the book and the compiler in the framing narrative, Mormon places Ammonihah's destruction in the context of an unexpected Nephite–Lamanite war, casting the leveling of the city and its people as divine retribution for the violence committed in the narrative. The Nephites repel the Lamanite invasion, but Ammonihah is destroyed, with the scale of death so immense the resulting odor discourages reoccupation of the area for years. Because the Ammonihahites were followers of Nehor, the ruins are called the "Desolation of Nehors".

In the rest of the Book of Mormon, Ammonihah briefly reappears twice. The first time is in Alma 25, when Mormon recapitulates its destruction as part of an overlapping plot involving war and politics, portraying Ammonihah's destruction earlier in the book as not wholly sudden but the result of other Nephite–Lamanite tensions. The last appearance is set ten years later in Alma 49:15, in which the city of Ammonihah—described as having been rebuilt with fortifications under the direction of Nephite military leader Captain Moroni—repels a Lamanite attack.

== Intertextuality ==
Amulek's hosting of Alma at the command of an angel resembles the story of Lot hosting angels in Sodom: for both Amulek and Lot, providing hospitality to divinely sent messengers (a prophet in Amulek's case and angels in Lots) against the grain of the inhospitable surrounding community (Ammonihah or Sodom) comes at a terrible cost to them and their families, as the mob of Sodom attacks Lot's daughters while Ammonihah kills Amulek's family.

When Alma justifies God not intervening to save the martyrs at Ammonihah, he says "the Lord receiveth them [the martyrs] up unto himself, in glory".

Alma's and Amulek's divinely-enabled escape from the Ammonihah prison resembles the New Testament's prison deliverance stories: the liberation of Peter in Acts 12 and that of Paul and Silas in Acts 16. The prayer Alma gives that precipitates his and Amulek's deliverance alludes to Samson's prayer in Judges 16.

== Interpretation ==
Literary scholar Kylie Nielson Turley writes that the Ammonihah story is "one of the most disturbing episodes in the Book of Mormon" on account of its graphic violence and the twisted, personal motives behind that violence.

== Artistic depictions ==
Artistic depictions of scenes of Ammonihah appear in George Reynolds's 1888 The Story of the Book of Mormon, a book containing what Noel Carmack identifies as "the first published attempt at illustrating the Book of Mormon". John Held Sr., an engraver and the father of cartoonist John Held Jr., created The Martyrdoms at Ammonihah and The Deliverance of Alma and Amulek (both pictured above) as woodblock prints. Carmack calls Martyrdoms Held's "strongest, most skillful piece" created for Story of the Book of Mormon and considers its "complex, action-filled" scene rare even in contemporary Book of Mormon art.

American painter Minerva Teichert renders the Ammonihah prison deliverance scene in her The Earthquake (c.1949–1951), showing Alma and Amulek's chains breaking as an earthquake collapses the building on their captors.

== See also ==
- Christian martyr
- Outline of the Book of Mormon
- Problem of evil

== Sources ==
- Belnap, Dan (2014). "'And it came to pass...': The Sociopolitical Events in the Book of Mormon Leading to the Eighteenth Year of the Reign of the Judges". Journal of Book of Mormon Studies. 23: 101–139. doi:10.5406/jbookmormstud2.23.2014.0101. ISSN 2374-4766.
- Bushman, Richard Lyman (2005). Joseph Smith: Rough Stone Rolling. Alfred A. Knopf. ISBN 978-1-4000-4270-8.
- Bushman, Richard Lyman (2008). Mormonism: A Very Short Introduction. Very Short Introductions. Vol. 183. Oxford University Press. ISBN 978-0-19-531030-6.
- Carmack, Noel A. (2008). "'A Picturesque and Dramatic History': George Reynolds's Story of the Book of Mormon". Brigham Young University Studies. 47 (2): 115–141. ISSN 0007-0106. JSTOR 43044637.
- Clark, John L. (2002). "Painting Out the Messiah: The Theologies of Dissidents". Journal of Book of Mormon Studies. 11: 16–27, 107–8. doi:10.5406/jbookmormstud.11.1.0016. eISSN 2168-3158. ISSN 1065-9366.
- Gardner, Brant A. (2007). Second Witness: Analytical and Contextual Commentary on the Book of Mormon. Vol. 4, Alma. Greg Kofford Books. ISBN 978-1-58958-044-2.
- Gee, John (2023). "Book of Mormon Names: Beyond Etymology". In Oaks, Dallin D.; Baltes, Paul; Minson, Kent (eds.). Perspectives on Latter-day Saint Names and Naming: Names, Identity, and Belief. Routledge. doi:10.4324/9781003325000. ISBN 978-1-03-235043-1.
- Hardy, Grant (2010). Understanding the Book of Mormon: A Reader's Guide. Oxford University Press. ISBN 978-0-19-974544-9.
- Shipps, Jan (1985). Mormonism: The Story of a New Religious Tradition. University of Illinois Press. ISBN 0-252-01159-7.
- Spencer, Joseph M. (2017). "The Structure of the Book of Alma". Journal of Book of Mormon Studies. 26: 273–283. hdl:1877/6087. JSTOR 10.18809/jbms.2017.0116.
- Swift, Charles (2012). "When Less Is More: The Reticent Narrator in the Story of Alma and Amulek". Religious Educator. 13 (1): 89–101.
- Thomas, John Christopher (2016). A Pentecostal Reads the Book of Mormon: A Literary and Theological Introduction. CPT Press. ISBN 978-1-935931-55-3.
- Turley, Kylie Nielson (2019). "Alma's Hell: Repentance, Consequence, and the Lake of Fire and Brimstone". Journal of Book of Mormon Studies. 28: 1–41. doi:10.5406/jbookmormstud2.28.2019.0001.
- Vogel, Dan (2004). Joseph Smith: The Making of a Prophet. Signature Books. ISBN 978-1-56085-179-0.
