= Anti-Nephi-Lehies =

Ethnic group in the Book of Mormon

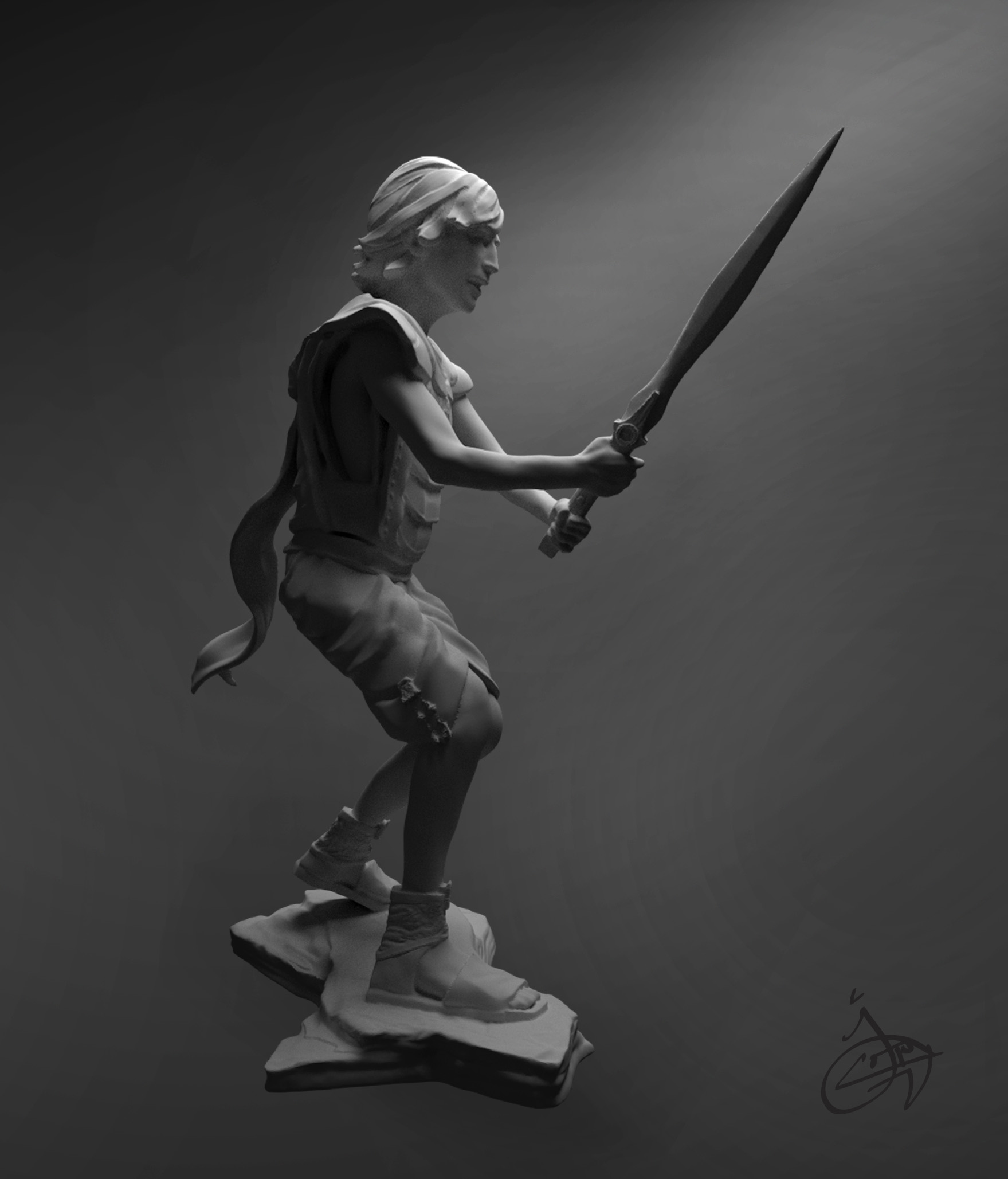
Depiction of a "Stripling Warrior", who according to the Book of Mormon was a member of the Anti-Nephi-Lehi ethnic group

According to the Book of Mormon, the Anti-Nephi-Lehies (/ˈæntaɪ ˈniːfaɪ ˈliːhaɪz/) were a tribe of Lamanites formed around 90 BC in the Americas, after a significant religious conversion. They made a covenant that they would not participate in war, and buried their weapons. Eventually they changed their name to the people of Ammon, or Ammonites. During a later period of warfare, the young men of the group who had not made the covenant became a military unit known as the two thousand stripling warriors, and were protected by divine intervention.

Most Latter Day Saint movement denominations, including The Church of Jesus Christ of Latter-day Saints (LDS Church), believe the Anti-Nephi-Lehies to have been an actual ethnic group living in the western hemisphere in the first century BC. The Community of Christ allows for varying beliefs regarding the historicity of the Anti-Nephi-Lehies. Among non-Mormon researchers across the archaeological, historical, and scientific communities, a consensus exists that the Book of Mormon is not a record of actual historical events.

The story of the Anti-Nephi-Lehies and particularly that of the stripling warriors is iconic in the Latter Day Saint movement. Some have criticized it for perpetuating negative stereotypes of Native Americans from a eurocentric viewpoint.

== Book of Mormon narrative ==
According to the Book of Mormon, around 600 BC, several families of Israelites were led by God from the Jerusalem area to the western hemisphere. Shortly after arriving, the group split into a righteous faction called the Nephites and a wicked faction called the Lamanites. To distinguish between the two, God cursed the Lamanites, causing "a skin of blackness" so they would "not be enticing".

Around 92 BC, four sons of the Nephite King, named Ammon, Aaron, Omner, and Himni, went on a mission with a small group of others to the Lamanites to convert them to Christianity. A significant number of Lamanites converted to Christianity, banded together and took the name Anti-Nephi-Lehies, rejecting the name Lamanite. The king of the newly formed people died, and his son becomes king, changing his name to Anti-Nephi-Lehi (note: the pronouns in the English translation make it unclear if Anti-Nephi-Lehi chose this name for himself or it was given him by his father). Fearful of returning to their past sins and as a sign of their covenant with God, they gathered their weapons, buried them, and committed to being pacifists and friendly with the Nephites. God then lifted their curse of dark skin.

The wicked portion of the Lamanites attacked Anti-Nephi-Lehies, but they did not attack back, instead allowed themselves to be killed while prostrate in prayer. After 1,005 had been killed, the Lamanites felt guilty and stopped attacking. Many of the Lamanites then joined the Anti-Nephi-Lehies. Others were rallied by dissident Nephites to attack the Nephites but are repelled. To avoid further attacks on them, God commanded Ammon to lead the group to join the Nephites, and they changed their name to the people of Ammon or Ammonites. They were given the Land of Jershon by the Nephites.

When an anti-Christ named Korihor tried to teach atheism to the Ammonites, they bound him and took him to the high priest.

=== Stripling warriors ===
In a subsequent war between the Nephites and Lamanites, when the Ammonites saw how the Nephite army suffered in defending them, they considered breaking their oath to lay down their weapons and defend themselves; a Nephite prophet named Helaman persuaded them not to break their oath. Two thousand of their sons (who had been too young at the time to have made the pacifist covenant) volunteered to fight for the defense of the Nephites and the Ammonites. The young men asked Helaman to be their commander. The young stripling warriors fought alongside the Nephite army and were one of the Nephites' most effective military units. Though every soldier was wounded at one time or another, there were no fatalities among the warriors. Helaman attributed this to the upbringing provided by their mothers and the great faith they exhibited. The original 2,000 "sons of Helaman" were later joined by sixty more, making a total of 2,060.

The last time the people of Ammon are mentioned in the Book of Mormon, a large portion of them migrated to the "land northward" sometime between 49 and 39 BC.

== Significance to the Latter Day Saint movement ==
Painting by Del Parson demonstrating the modern usage of the story to teach "earnest repentance and resolute faith in the face of adversity." A stripling warrior boy watches in the background. This is the only painting of the Anti-Nephi-Lehies to be broadly distributed.

The Anti-Nephi-Lehies are a well known and popular example of faith within the Latter Day Saint tradition, particularly the story of the stripling warriors, which has become iconic, celebrated in Latter Day Saint artwork, toys, song, and literature.

=== Usage prior to 1900 ===
The Anti-Nephi-Lehi pacifism story was barely referenced in the first fifty years of the LDS Church. In 1880s, during the height of the United States government crackdown on the LDS Church practice of polygamy, church leader George Reynolds gave the first serious interpretation, by using the Anti-Nephi-Lehi story of passive submission to Lamanite armies as an object lesson to support the church's policy of civil disobedience being both moral and effective. His writings were later incorporated into education materials.

=== Usage from 1900 to 1950 ===
Though pacifism was not an official doctrine, in the first half of the 20th century there was a significant strain of pacifism within the LDS Church. In the 1920s, LDS Church scholar Janne Sjödahl and author John Henry Evans both used the example of the Anti-Nephi-Lehies complete rejection of violence as a matter of superior moral principle. In 1935, the official Sunday School curriculum said of the Anti-Nephi-Lehies that "there is a suggestion in the Record that it is better to take a pacific stand in time of war," and concluded with "our attitude, then, toward war should be to avoid it when and if we can." The 1939 manual, on the eve of World War II advocated clearly for pacifism,

"There is no place in a Christian life for war....If one should question the wisdom of the decision of the people of Anti-Nephi-Lehi made on the occasion of this lesson, let him remember that they did as a nation what Jesus did as an individual when he gave his life for mankind ... there was something 'godlike' in the decision of both Jesus and the Lamanites to sacrifice their mortal existence that the standards of righteousness might be preserved. ...The people of Ammon would rather be slaughtered than to take the life of another in their own defense. The Nephites on the other hand justified their defense of their families and liberties on the ground that it was the will of God that these things be preserved. However the readers of these lessons might feel on this subject, it seems clear that if war has any justification at all in the eyes of God, it must be a war of defense, not aggression—a war where the right to worship, and to live in family units, and in safety are being fought for."

After the beginning of World War II church manuals commended Anti-Nephi-Lehies for their righteousness, but did not imply pacifism as being superior, instead using the story as part of the definition for what constitutes a just war.

=== Usage from 1950 to 1980 ===
In 1950, Professor William E. Berrett wrote a critique of the Anti-Nephi-Lehies as part of his study of the Book of Mormon that would become a dominant narrative for the next several decades, calling their pacifist actions, "an interesting experiment in non-resistance" but ultimately not effective. "Although the Anti-Nephi-Lehies received a short respite it was not long before it became apparent that to save their lives they must flee to the land of the Nephites and be protected by Nephite arms." The LDS Church translated Berrett's book into several languages, and it became the Melchizedek Priesthood manual in 1962, and appointed Berrett as vice president of Brigham Young University, giving him responsibility over high school and college age church curriculum's. The Anti-Nephi-Lehi vow of non-violence came to be seen as an anomaly, applicable only in rare circumstances, and discussion of the topic in manuals usually included examples that justified armed self-resistance.

Although a strain of pacifism existed within the LDS Church that used the Anti-Nephi-Lehies as an example, pacifist ethics have not been part of Church Education System curriculum since that time. Brigham Young University professor Hugh Nibley was representative of the exception, speaking out against war and using the Anti-Nephi-Lehies as pacifist examples worthy of emulating. The critical interpretation of the Anti-Nephi-Lehies decision to be killed rather than fight was notable in that it coincided with the a significant segment of the church that opposed the Civil Rights Movement and the tactic of civil disobedience in particular.

Two Thousand Stripling Warriors by Arnold Friberg. His interpretation is defining, and was part of a trend towards a 'muscular' interpretation of the Book of Mormon.

In the 1950s, artist Arnold Friberg was commissioned to paint 12 scenes from the Book of Mormon for children, and chose for one of his scenes the stripling warriors. His interpretation became enormously popular and for many decades "tended to sweep aside alternative artistic concepts". His painting of the young men became iconic, and has been printed in millions of copies of the Book of Mormon, and remains popular in Latter Day Saint culture. Of the painting Friberg said,

"They call them striplings—some say, 'the Boy Scout army.' No! No! They were young men. They were like David. They talk about David going out and taking on Goliath. They said, 'He is a man of war and you are just a youth.' That doesn't mean that he was a little eight-year-old. In his statue of David, Michelangelo captures a splendid young man, athletic, maybe not as mature as men of war, but still a boy compared to them. That is the way I figure these youths were"

Historian J. David Pulsipher notes that the Friberg's interpretation was part of "an increasing tendency toward 'muscular' interpretations of the Book of Mormon, a trend exemplified by Ezra Taft Benson's reading of the text."

=== Usage from 1980 to the present ===
Beginning in the early 1980s, manuals of the LDS Church began to emphasize the metaphorical value of the story. Rather than commenting on the political morality of war, the Anti-Nephi-Lehies were used as examples of repentance and deep commitment that should be emulated in individual lives by "burying" sins in an equally permanent way. In 1983, the LDS Church commissioned artist Del Parson to paint the story of the Anti-Nephi-Lehies burying their swords, and widely distributed it in educational material. The painting was at the forefront of the shift towards the metaphorical usage of the story, depicting an Anti-Nephi-Lehi man kneeling and raising his sword toward heaven, as though presenting an offering of his sins to God.

Using the story for its metaphorical applications has today become the dominant approach in the LDS Church, as exemplified by a 2014 Sunday School lesson for children, where students were instructed to mimic the Anti-Nephi-Lehies by writing on paper swords, "a wrong choice ... such as 'fighting with my brother' or 'telling a lie." These paper swords were then "buried ... by crumpling their papers or throwing them away."

In 2016, LDS Church owned newspaper the Deseret News printed an editorial using the story of the Nephites accepting the Anti-Nephi-Lehies into their country to promote the ethic of assisting refugees migrating to Europe.

The story of the Ammonite mothers teaching their stripling warrior sons is frequently used as an example of the importance of Motherhood in instilling faith in their children.

== Etymology of names ==
The name Anti-Nephi-Lehi has confused some as the prefix "anti" implies that they are against Nephi-Lehi. A textual clue occurs in Alma 23:16 which says the name was taken to be "distinguished from their brethren [the Lamanites]". There are several speculations as to the meaning of the name:

- A common interpretation is that "Anti" means "Not" instead of "Against", rendering the name to mean "Not descendants of Nephi, but of Lehi".
- Historian Dan Vogel notes that in the Book of Mormon, the land of Lehi-Nephi was a region where Limhi's people had been kept captive before rebelling and escaping. Thus adopting the name Anti-Nephi-Lehi was a way of symbolizing their own rebellion against traditional Lamanite ways, or becoming anti-Lamanite.
- Michael Austin, a Mormon literary critic, cites the spelling of the term in the original manuscript to suggest that Joseph Smith originally used the term Ante-Nephi-Lehi, meaning "the people of Lehi before Nephi." The term, Austin suggests, "asserts an essential unity in the family of Lehi" and "attempts to heal the . . . tragic division of the Book of Mormon and the heritage of violence that it produced."

LDS Church scholars who believe the Book of Mormon was written in a language related to Egyptian with Hebraic influences suggest further potential meanings:

- Hugh Nibley suggested that "Anti" may be a reflex of the Egyptian "nty:", he of, the one of. Thus, rather than having the sense "against", it may have the meaning "the one of Nephi and Lehi".
- Hugh Nibley further suggested that it could have semitic origins and mean "Nephi brought face to face with other descendents of Lehi".
- John Gee, Brian M. Hauglid and Paul Hoskisson suggest the name is a transliteration.

In Joseph Smith's time, the word "stripling" meant "a youth in the state of adolescence, or just passing from boyhood to manhood; a lad".

== Literary analysis ==
The missionary Ammon, who plays a major part in the conversion of the Anti-Nephi-Lehies, is used as an example of a larger criticism and theme of the Book of Mormon, that its main characters are often portrayed as extremes of either uncompromisingly good, or unsurpassingly evil.

The conversion and unwavering faith of the Anti-Nephi-Lehies mirrors and is used as a contrast with the wickedness of Nephite dissenters who move in the opposite direction and live with the Lamanites (i.e. Zoramites and Amalickiah).

Several modern day historians believe that later sections of the Book of Mormon clearly indicate that rather than advocating for pacifism, the rejection of violence was more about complete commitment to God at all costs. The Anti-Nephi-Lehies adopted pacifism as a covenant with God that they would distance themselves from their prior murderous habits, but did not generalize this requirement to others including their children.

The language that is used when the Lord commands the Anti-Nephi-Lehies to leave the Lamanite lands and go to the Nephite lands is identical in parts to an earlier section in the Book of Mormon where a prophet Alma is commanded to take his group of Nephite slaves out of the Lamanite lands. In both, the commandment reads, "Get this people out of this land, ... therefore, get thee out of this land."

The attack on the Nephites that is sparked by the aborted attack on the Anti-Nephi-Lehies is described in two different narrative strands, once in Alma 16:6–9 and the other time in Alma 25:3, and 27:1. There is an inconsistency between the two accounts; in the first account the Lamanites are driven back after one great battle, while in the second there are "many battles". Of the discrepancy, LDS Church Book of Mormon Scholar Grant Hardy writes that this might be an example of the narrator "trying not to unduly burden his narrative with unnecessary details," and that one version is presented for historical reasons while the other is to promote a spiritual message.

The text of the Book of Mormon notes that hundreds of the stripling warriors "fainted because of blood". Surgeon Robert Patterson observed of the miracle that "the epic tale of the stripling warriors and their miraculous recovery from life-threatening trauma would appear, to the rational mind, highly unlikely or even outright impossible. Hundreds of people, even fit young males, simply do not get up and walk away after experiencing Class 4 hypovolemic shock. Perhaps even Joseph Smith, uneducated as he was, did not appreciate the improbability of Helaman's narrative."

=== Criticism ===
A major theme and stated purpose of the Book of Mormon, is the conversion of the modern day Lamanite descendants to Christianity. The early adherents to the Latter Day Saint movement believed that all Native Americans were Lamanite descendants. There is agreement in academia that the characterization within the Book of Mormon of the Anti-Nephi-Lehies before and after their conversion is consistent with a eurocentric viewpoint of Native Americans endemic to 1820s New England. In line with prevailing views of Native Americans in the late 1820s, the Book of Mormon portrays Lamanites as, "wild and ferocious, and blood-thirsty people, full of idolatry and filthiness." After their conversion, the Anti-Nephi-Lehies reflect the eurocentric, or Nephite ideal: "they were brought to believe in the traditions of the Nephites ... they did lay down the weapons of their rebellion ... they began to be a very industrious people; yea, and they were friendly with the Nephites; therefore, they did open a correspondence with them, and the curse of God did no more follow them."

The atheist Korihor is allowed to preach freely among the Nephites, because of Nephite laws protecting free expression. The decision by the Ammonites to bind Korihor is praised by Mormon, the narrator, saying they "were more wise than many of the Nephites." Historian Dan Vogel sees this as a reflection of the 1820s political culture in the United States, an example of the Book of Mormon ideal of state-sponsored church, and showed misgivings that Joseph Smith had with tolerance for religious diversity, preferring instead a mixture of religious and political power.
