= Helaman =

Figure in the Book of Mormon

The Book of Mormon mentions three men named Helaman (/ˈhiːləmən/ HEE-lə-mən). The first was a son of King Benjamin, king of the united Nephite-Zarahemla kingdom, who lived in the 2nd century BC. Besides his genealogy, information about the first Helaman is limited. His brother, Mosiah, became heir to the throne.

The second was a Nephite prophet and military leader who lived around the 1st century BC. He was the grandson of Alma and the eldest son of Alma the Younger, and was entrusted with maintaining a record of their people, the Nephites, as found in the Book of Alma. According to the Book of Mormon, he led into battle an army of two thousand young male warriors, which he referred to as his two thousand sons (two thousand stripling warriors). Most of the parts of the narrative involving Helaman come from the latter half of the Book of Alma.

The third Helaman was the son of the above mentioned Helaman. He was a chief judge over the Nephites and was also responsible for maintaining a record of this people. The account that Helaman kept was recorded on the same records as his father. This record, however, was first given by Helaman (the father) to his brother Shiblon, who then handed the record down to his nephew, Helaman. The writings of this second Helaman are contained within the Book of Helaman.

== Etymology ==
Joseph Smith had no knowledge of any foreign language at the time of the Book of Mormon's composition, and the name "Helaman" has never been discovered in any non-Mormon text. However, Brigham Young University's Book of Mormon Onomasticon includes several apologetic etymologies for the name, including "Hammer of God".

== Early life ==
Helaman was the eldest son of Alma the Younger, another Nephite prophet. The exact time and place of his birth are unknown. The house of his father, Alma, was in Zarahemla, the Nephite capital, and Helaman may have also lived in Zarahemla.

The Book of Mormon first mentions Helaman in Alma 31:7, and little is known of his life prior to this brief allusion. In this verse, Helaman's father Alma, and two younger brothers Shiblon and Corianton, embark on a missionary journey to the Zoramites, but Helaman does not accompany them. This journey occurred towards the end of the 17th year of the "reign of the judges", which probably corresponds to about 75 BC.

== Later life ==
After their missionary labors among the Zoramites, Alma, his sons, and the rest of their company returned to Zarahemla. At this time Alma gathered his sons together to give each of them a charge. In his charge to Helaman, Alma recounts his own conversion, exhorts Helaman to righteousness, and confers stewardship of the sacred records and other artifacts (including the "interpreters", or Urim and Thummim). to Helaman. These sacred records were passed down from generation to generation throughout the history of the Nephites, with each generation adding the story of their own time. It was these records which Mormon and Moroni drew from and abridged when compiling the Book of Mormon. Helaman accepted the records and continued the record-keeping tradition. The section of the Book of Alma beginning at chapter 45 states that it is, "The account of the people of Nephi, and their wars and dissensions, in the days of Helaman, according to the record of Helaman, which he kept in his days." This section may possibly continue as far as chapter 62, wherein Helaman dies.

Following Alma's words to his sons, he and his sons (including, presumably, Helaman) went among the people for a time, preaching the word of God. Shortly afterward, in the 19th year of the reign of the judges (c. 73 BC), Alma approached Helaman for an important conversation. In what some consider a good model for child-parent interviews, Alma questioned Helaman, praised him for his beliefs, and blessed him. Alma also dictated to him a prophecy of the destruction of the Nephites, which Alma commanded him to record but not to make known until it was fulfilled. Not long after his charge to Helaman, Alma departed and was never heard of again.

After this, Helaman and his brethren went among the people declaring the word of God and appointing "priests and teachers throughout all the land, over all the churches." Dissension arose, allegedly due to the people's pride and riches, and the people thus would not heed the words of Helaman and his brethren.

For the next several years, Helaman worked as a high priest in the Church, though not necessarily as the high priest over the Church. Helaman's work suffered major set-backs during Amalickiah's rise, but then prospered in the years following Amalickiah's departure from the Nephites to the Lamanites.

== Ministering to the Anti-Nephi-Lehies ==
Helaman next appears in Alma 53, in the 26th year of the reign of the judges (c. 66 BC), trying to persuade the Anti-Nephi-Lehies, also known as Ammonites, not to take up arms. Years earlier, upon their conversion to the gospel of Christ, the Anti-Nephi-Lehies had made an oath to God that they "never would use weapons again for the shedding of man's blood." The Nephites and the Lamanites were embroiled in war, and the Anti-Nephi-Lehies wished to join the conflict and fight alongside the Nephites. However, to do so would mean breaking the oath which they had made. Helaman "feared lest by so doing they should lose their souls." Overpowered by the persuasions of Helaman, the Anti-Nephi-Lehies resigned themselves to being spectators in the conflict.

However, the Anti-Nephi-Lehies had many sons who, unlike their fathers, had never entered into a covenant not to take up weapons of war. These sons also wished to fight for the Nephites and have Helaman as their leader. With no oath restricting them and the Nephites in desperate circumstances, they were permitted to do so. There is no indication prior to this in the text that Helaman had any military training whatsoever, and indeed he may not have. Certainly, the sons of the Anti-Nephi-Lehies had no fighting experience. Regardless, the interesting turn of events made Helaman have the Anti-Nephi-Lehies marching at the head of an army of two thousand soldiers. LDS leader Richard J. Maynes cited the entire episode in a General Conference as containing good examples of covenant-keeping behavior.

== Commander of the Stripling Warriors ==
Helaman's army of two thousand young men is often referred to as the two thousand stripling warriors, or the sons of Helaman. Theirs is one of the most well-known stories from the Book of Mormon.

In brief, Helaman and his band marched in the 26th year of the reign of the judges (c. 66 BC) to the western part of the land of the Nephites and there joined the existing Nephite forces. There they played a pivotal role in some crucial Nephite victories. As a result of those victories, the Nephites regained possession of all of the western cities which had been taken by the Lamanites. Although two of their battles were very bloody, the army of Helaman did not incur a single fatality. Helaman attributed this to divine preservation.

Helaman wrote an epistle to the captain of the Nephite armies, Moroni, informing him of their success and expressing confusion that the government did not send more troops and support to the western front. Moroni received the epistle in the 30th year of the reign of the judges (c. 62 BC). The next year the Nephites successfully drove the Lamanites back into the land southward and thus the war ended at last.

== Last years ==
After the war ended in the 31st year of the reign of the judges (c. 61 BC), Helaman first briefly "returned to the place of his inheritance". He then went forth with his brethren, preaching the word of God and establishing the Church. About four years later, in the 35th year of the reign of the judges (c. 57 BC), Helaman died. At the time of his death, Helaman had not yet formally conferred stewardship of the sacred records and artifacts to his son, Helaman, as would have been traditional. Instead Shiblon "took possession of those sacred things" following Helaman's death.

== See also ==
- Book of Alma
- Two thousand stripling warriors

| Preceded by Alma the Younger | Nephite record keeper the 19th–35th years of the reign of the judges, or 73–57 BC | Succeeded by Shiblon |
