= Book of Helaman =

Book of the Book of Mormon

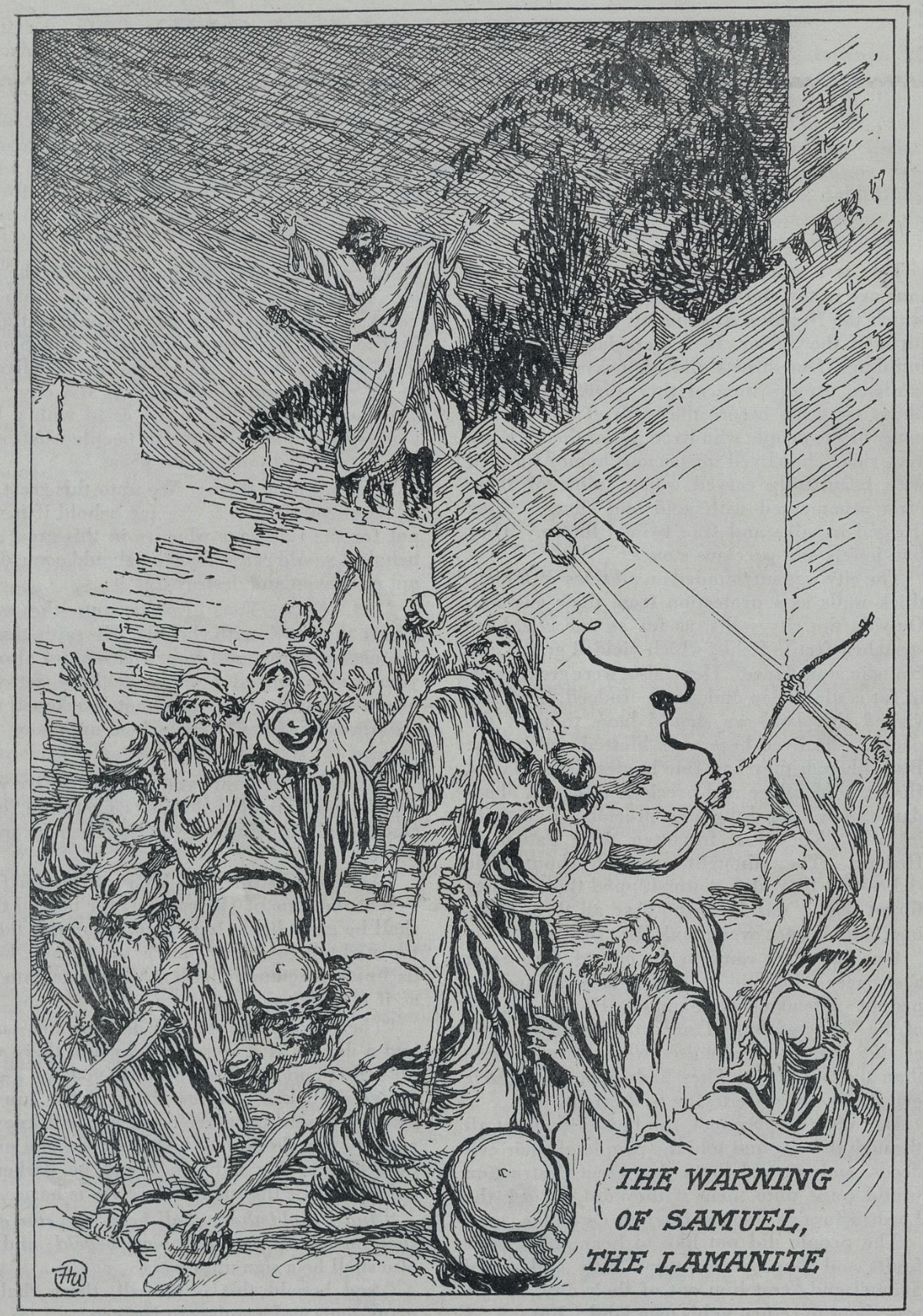
The Warning of Samuel the Lamanite, an illustration accompanying Genet Bingham Dee's "The Warning of Samuel, the Lamanite: Parts of Helaman, Chapters 13, 14, 15, 16", True Stories We Love, The Children's Friend 24, no. 1 (November 1925): 411–413.

The Book of Helaman (/ˈhiːləmən/ HEE-lə-mən) is one of the books that make up the Book of Mormon, a text held sacred by churches within the Latter Day Saint movement, including the Church of Jesus Christ of Latter-day Saints (LDS Church). The book continues the history of the Nephites and the Lamanites from approximately 50 BC to 1 BC. It discusses political unrest among the Nephites and the formation of a group of secret dissenters called the Gadianton robbers. Helaman, son of Helaman, leads the Nephites for a time, and his sons, Nephi and Lehi, go on a successful mission to the Lamanites. When Nephi returns home, he correctly identifies the murderer of the chief judge using his prophetic powers, and sends a famine to the Nephites which lasts three years. After a digression from Mormon, the book of Helaman ends with Samuel the Lamanite's prophecy of the signs that will precede Christ's birth and death. Helaman deals with themes of external and internal conflict, hidden information, Nephite racism, and Mormon's views of history as deduced by his redaction of it.

== Summary ==
According to the narrative in the Book of Mormon, the Book of Helaman is set in 50–1 BC, and the book is named for Alma the Younger’s grandson, Helaman, son of Helaman. The actions of the first three chapters center around him. Helaman's son Nephi is central to the rest of the record. The book of Helaman as a whole is edited and compiled by Mormon, who is the author of chapter 12. Events are related episodically. The miraculous incidents in Helaman 5 describe a significant conversion of many Lamanites to Book of Mormon Christianity.

In the first part of Helaman, a secret society, commonly called a "secret combination", spurs political unrest among the Nephites. Pahoran, son of Pahoran, wins the election to be the new chief judge. The younger Panoran’s brother Paanchi and his followers swear an oath of secrecy to one another and murder the newly-appointed chief judge Pahoran. A few months later, a Lamanite army captures the Nephite capital until the Nephites reclaim it. Helaman, son of Helaman is elected as the new chief judge. The same group who murdered Pahoran tries to murder Helaman, but a spy kills the assassin before he succeeds. The group retreats to the wilderness and they are referred to as a "band of robbers". (Chapters 1–2.)

The second part of Helaman covers a period of Nephite technological growth, war with the Lamanites, and proselyting to the Lamanites. Helaman reigns over the Nephites, who develop shipping, expand northward, and become wealthy and prideful. Helaman dies and his son Nephi becomes chief judge. Disagreements in the land of the Nephites lead to war with the Lamanites, where Moronihah conquers half of their land. After stepping down as chief judge, Nephi goes with his brother Lehi to preach to the Nephites and the Lamanites. Lamanites in Nephites lands imprison them. Angels and a pillar of fire manifest and their presence sparks the conversion of onlookers, who in turn convert the Lamanites, who peaceably leave the Nephite lands they were occupying. The Gadianton robbers return and murder Cezoram, who filled in for Nephi in the judgement seat. Meanwhile, the Lamanites' righteousness increases. (Chapters 3–6.)

In the third part of Helaman, Nephi prophesies about the Nephites and their future. Nephi comes home after his six-year mission to find that the Nephites have become wicked in his absence. He says that the Nephites' destruction is nigh. He prophesies that the chief judge has been murdered by his brother, and this prophecy is confirmed. He prophesies that the brother will deny murdering the chief judge, but that the blood on the skirts of his cloak will give him away. The Nephites are divided. God grants Nephi the power to do "all things" "according to [his] word". Nephi sends a famine into the land for three years, when many people return to their faith and Nephi prays the rain back. The Gadianton robbers become more powerful. (Chapters 7–11.)

In the last part of Helaman, Samuel the Lamanite prophesies that the Nephites will be destroyed in 400 years. He promises that their attempts to secure their future using money will fail. He says that unless the Nephites repent, their women and children will suffer and die. He foretells of the signs and wonders of Jesus' birth and death. The Nephites reject his prophecies. (Chapters 13–16)

== Themes ==
=== War and contention ===
The short preface to the Book of Helaman is written by Mormon, the editor of the books following Omni according to the Book of Mormon narrative. Mormon describes the book of Helaman as being about "wars and contentions". According to Brant Gardner, author of a six-volume commentary that grew out of his work for the Foundation for Ancient Research and Mormon Studies, the goal of Mormon's compilation is theological, not historical. "Contentions" refers to internal conflicts, while "wars" refers to external ones. Mormon may have chosen to focus on contentions to fulfill Nephi's vision when Nephi sees "wars, and rumors of wars" as well as "wars and contentions in the land". For Gardner, Mormon isn't just trying to fulfill Nephi's vision, but also to show that Christ's coming is a type, and that it was and will be preceded by war and contention.

In Helaman, the Gadianton robbers are mentioned for the first time in the text of the Book of Mormon, a recurring instance of Nephite secret combinations important to the rest of the Book of Mormon narrative. According to Maxwell Institute scholar Kim Matheson, Helaman's contrasts show how the Nephites are constantly noticing the wrong things. Instead of noticing their own spiritual decay, they increase their wealth and military power. Important aspects of the plot are covert, like the secret combinations, assassins, and spiritual alignment with God.

Former dean of religious education at Brigham Young University, Robert J. Matthews, noticed that within the Nephite culture, because the majority of the people chose evil, the government became corrupt, even though it was a form of free government. People in government started to ignore the poor and there was a general disdain of the law. In the Book of Mormon Reference Companion, published by LDS Church publisher Deseret Book, John Tanner also highlights the passage in Helaman about how "they who chose evil were more numerous than they who chose good."

=== Nephite racism ===
Helaman ends with Samuel prophesying of Christ and the Nephites rejecting Samuel's prophecy. Samuel does not mention Christ's resurrection, but focuses on the signs of his birth and death. For Grant Hardy, in his The Annotated Book of Mormon, since Samuel is a Lamanite, it is possible that Nephite racism contributed to their rejection of him. For Matheson, Nephite racism causes them to reject Samuel, and their interest in comparing themselves to the Lamanites prevents them from honestly repenting of their misdeeds.

=== Pride cycle ===
In Mormon's digression in Helaman 12, he describes the cycle of righteousness and unrighteousness. He reveals his assumption that the righteousness of a people is the most important historical question to consider, relegating factors such as economic growth to their influence on the righteousness of the people. For Tanner, Mormon draws attention to his commentary with the phrase "thus we see," and his "fullest articulation of the cyclical pattern" is found in Helaman 12. Hardy describes this "pride cycle" as one of the main features of Helaman. Prosperous Nephites become prideful and forget God, which leads to their downfall. Humbled, they return to worshipping God and become prosperous again. Hardy draws a parallel to a similar cycle in the Biblical Book of Judges, noting that in Helaman, communal repentance plays a larger role. In the larger narrative of the Book of Mormon, this cycle is broken for 200 years after Jesus visits the land.

== Textual variants ==
In the 1830 edition of the Book of Mormon, Joseph Smith originally gave his scribes an arrangement of five chapters that were larger than the chapters in modern editions of the Book of Mormon.

in Joseph's manuscript	in current LDS edition (since 1879)	summary
Chapter I	Helaman 1–2	formation of secret combinations and political unrest
Chapter II	Helaman 3–6	increasing Nephite prosperity and Lamanite conversion
Chapter III	Helaman 7–10	the prophecy of Nephi
Chapter IV	Helaman 11–12	Mormon's brief poetic interlude
Chapter V	Helaman 13–16	Samuel's prophecy

== See also ==
- Aminadab

== Sources ==
- Gardner, Brant (2007). Second Witness. Volume 5 Helaman—Third Nephi. Vol. 5. Greg Kofford Books. ISBN 978-1-58958-045-9. Wikidata Q123118002.
- Hardy, Grant, ed. (2023). The Annotated Book of Mormon. Oxford University Press. ISBN 978-0-19-008220-8. OL 46783409M. Wikidata Q122259222.
- Mackay, Thomas W. (1992). "Mormon's Philosophy of History: Helaman 12 in the Perspective of Mormon's Editing Procedure". In Nyman, Monte S.; Tate, Charles D. (eds.). The Book of Mormon: Helaman Through 3 Nephi 8, According to Thy Word. Provo, UT: Religious Studies Center, Brigham Young University. ISBN 0-8849-4864-1.
- Kimberly Matheson (2020), Helaman: A Brief Theological Introduction, Maxwell Institute, Wikidata Q122308242
- Matthews, Robert J. (1992). "Patterns of Apostasy in the Book of Helaman". In Nyman, Monte S.; Tate, Charles D. (eds.). The Book of Mormon: Helaman Through 3 Nephi 8, According to Thy Word. Provo, UT: Religious Studies Center, Brigham Young University. ISBN 0-8849-4864-1.
- Tanner, John Sears (2003). "Helaman, book of". In Largey, Dennis L.; Arnold, Marilyn; Ball, Terry B.; Dahl, Larry E.; Parry, Donald W.; Seely, David R.; Williams, Clyde J. (eds.). Book of Mormon Reference Companion. Deseret Book Company. ISBN 1573452319.
- Thomas, John Christopher (2016). A Pentecostal Reads the Book of Mormon: A Literary and Theological Introduction. CPT Press. ISBN 978-1-935931-55-3. Wikidata Q123196681.

Book of Helaman Contribution of Mormon (Large Plates of Nephi)
Preceded by Alma	Book of Mormon	Succeeded by Third Nephi
