= Aaron (Nephite) =

According to the Book of Mormon, Aaron was a Nephite missionary and one of the sons of King Mosiah. He was also a brother to the prophet Ammon. As related in the Book of Mormon narrative, Aaron and his three brothers (Ammon, Omner, and Himni), left their father, and his people, to travel to the land of the Lamanites in order to preach the gospel to them.

During their sojourn there, Aaron was imprisoned and beaten, but eventually aided in the conversion of thousands of Lamanites, who later became the Anti-Nephi-Lehies.
