= Alma the Younger =

Prophet in the Book of Mormon

Alma
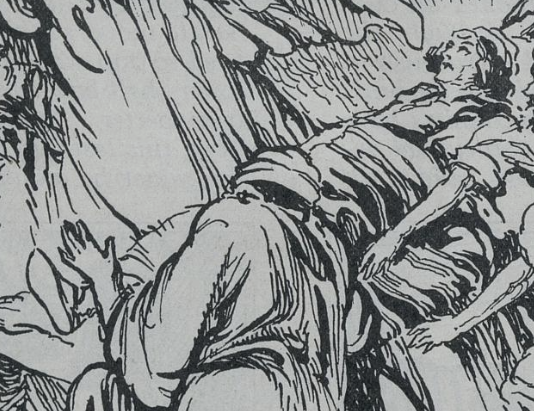
- From Alma Being Carried to His Father's House (October 1925)

Chief judge of the Nephites
- Preceded by: Office established
- Succeeded by: Nephihah

High priest of the Church
- Preceded by: Alma the Elder
- Succeeded by: Helaman

Personal life
- Children: Helaman; Shiblon; Corianton
- Era: Reign of the judges

In the Book of Mormon, Alma, the son of Alma (/ˈælmə/) is a Nephite prophet often referred to as Alma the Younger to distinguish him from his father, who is often referred to as Alma the Elder. These appellations, "the Younger" and "the Elder", are not used in the Book of Mormon; they are distinctions made by scholars, useful because both individuals were prominent during the same portion of the Book of Mormon's narrative and filled a similar cultural and religious role. Alma is the namesake of the Book of Alma.

== Conversion ==
Alma the Younger lived in Zarahemla during the end of the reign of the Nephite King Mosiah. As a young man, he, the four sons of Mosiah, and others wanted to destroy the church and actively persecuted its members. After they were visited personally by an angel and rebuked for their actions, Alma fell into an unconscious state where, for three days and three nights, he lay unable to move until he felt within that he had been forgiven of his sins. He later recounted that he had experienced a vision during unconsciousness, in which he renounced his behavior against the church and subsequently received a glimpse of God sitting on his throne (Alma 36:12–22). He and those who persecuted church members with him abdicated their role as persecutors and became followers of Jesus.

== Chief judge and high priest ==
Alma the Younger subsequently became the first elected chief judge of the Nephites as well as their religious leader.

When Amlici leads his followers in an insurrection against Nephite government, Alma as chief judge serves also as military commander and suppresses the Amlicites in the Amlicite Civil War.

== Ministry ==
He observed that the Nephites of the church were becoming increasingly wicked, proud, disdainful of outsiders and neglectful toward the poor and needy (Alma 4:11–12). When the "unbelievers" began to follow their example, Alma feared the entire people were on the path to self-destruction (Alma 4:11). He resigned his post as chief judge and began traveling from city to city to preach to the Nephites. He began in Zarahemla, where his efforts were successful. A thorough purge of the church leadership and membership took place, with those former insiders and leaders who refused to relinquish their pride being "rejected, and their names blotted out" (Alma 6:3).

Alma moved on to the cities of Gideon and Melek, where his call to humility was also well received. From Melek he traveled three days journey north to Ammonihah, whose inhabitants proved much more hardened than those of the previous three cities.

In Ammonihah the people were very wicked. They considered themselves superior to outsiders, especially the Lamanites, and gloried in the strength of their city, which they considered indestructible. According to Alma chapter 9, Satan held such control over them that they would not listen to Alma. While trying to speak to them he was abused and thrown out of the city. Commanded by an angel to return, Alma slipped back into the city through a different route from the south. There he met Amulek, a lapsed believer (Alma 10:5–6) of some social prominence who fed Alma and housed him for a time. In the city streets, the two of them joined up and preached to the people, where they were challenged by a lawyer named Zeezrom. After Amulek had silenced Zeezrom through his teaching and aroused his conscience, Alma took his turn, preaching to the people with similar results. When finished, Alma and Amulek were cast into prison and delivered by a miracle. A repentant Zeezrom eventually joined Alma in his missionary work.

Several years later, Alma met up with a man named Korihor, whom the Book of Mormon describes as an anti-Christ. This Korihor tried to lead the Nephites astray. Alma confronted him, confounding his arguments and miraculously removing Korihor's power of speech. The stricken Korihor signaled acknowledgement that he had acted maliciously, knowing all along that he was wrong and bringing destruction upon others. He was reduced to begging and was eventually run down and killed in a city of Nephite dissenters called Zoramites.

These same Zoramites were found to practice things that perverted the ways of the Lord. This led Alma to extend his missionary work to these people. While among them, he was most successful with the poor.

Alma's final instruction was to his sons, Helaman, Shiblon, and Corianton. He gave each separate lessons, and finally gave the records of the church to Helaman. He then departed, in the 19th year of the reign of the judges (or 73 BC) as if to go to Melek, but was never heard from again. Both Mormon and Helaman believed that he was taken up like Moses of old, and buried by the Lord.

== Descendants ==
The Book of Mormon narrative describes several of Alma's notable descendants as shown in the following family tree:

Alma the Elder
Alma the Younger
Helaman	Shiblon	Corianton
Helaman; Son of Helaman
Nephi; Son of Helaman	Lehi; Son of Helaman
Nephi the Disciple	Timothy; Son of Nephi
Nephi; Son of Nephi the Disciple
Amos; Son of Nephi
Amos; Son of Amos	Ammaron; Son of Amos

== Intertextuality ==
Alma's conversion is reminiscent of that of Saul of Tarsus, or Paul the Apostle, in the New Testament. Both persecute the Christian church, abruptly encounter divine figures (Jesus appears to Saul; an angel confronts Alma) that physically incapacitate them, and upon physically recovering, subsequently convert and commit to Christianity. Literary critic Michael Austin explains that by coexisting, these stories "encourage [readers] to universalize the possibility of conversion" and focus on the role of grace in Christian life.

== Sources ==
- Austin, Michael (2020). Buried Treasures: Reading the Book of Mormon Again for the First Time. By Common Consent Press. ISBN 978-1-948218-252.
- Austin, Michael (2024). The Testimony of Two Nations: How the Book of Mormon Reads, and Rereads, the Bible. University of Illinois Press. ISBN 9780252045356.
- Curtis, Susan (1990). "Early Nineteenth-century America and the Book of Mormon". In Vogel, Dan (ed.). The Word of God: Essays on Mormon Scripture. Signature Books. pp. 81–96. ISBN 0941214931.
- Davis, Ryan W. (2007). "For the Peace of the People: War and Democracy in the Book of Mormon". Journal of Book of Mormon Studies. 16 (1): 42–55, 85–86. ISSN 1065-9366. JSTOR 10.5406/jbookmormstud.16.1.0042.

Preceded by Mosiah II, son of Benjamin, as the last king of the Nephites	Chief Judge of the Nephites the 1st–9th years of the reign of the judges, or 92–83 BC.	Succeeded by Nephihah
Preceded by King Mosiah II, son of Benjamin, as king	Nephite military leader the 5th–? years of the reign of the judges, or 87–? BC	Succeeded by Zoram
Preceded by Mosiah II, son of Benjamin	Nephite record keeper the 1st–19th years of the reign of the judges, or 91–73 BC	Succeeded by Helaman
