= Ammon (Book of Mormon missionary) =

Character in the Book of Mormon

In the Book of Mormon, Ammon (/ˈæmən/) is a prominent Nephite missionary and a son of King Mosiah. He originally opposes the church, but along with his brothers and Alma the Younger, is miraculously converted. Following his conversion he serves a mission to the Lamanites and converts Lamoni and his people.

== Claims about origins of the name ==
Mormon apologist Hugh Nibley claimed that Ammon (or Amon) (Mosiah 7:3) is "the commonest name in the Book of Mormon" and "the commonest name in the Egyptian Empire" (which embraced Palestine at Lehi's time, which fell within its Late Period).

== Book of Mormon Narrative ==
=== Early life and conversion ===
As one of the four sons of King Mosiah, Ammon has tremendous influence among his people, the Nephites. He rejects the Church and attempts to turn the people from the teachings of the prophets. Because of the fervent prayers of their parents, Alma the Younger and the four sons of Mosiah have a conversion experience much like that of Paul the Apostle; an angel appears to them on the road and rebukes them for their wickedness. The shock puts Alma the Younger into an insensible state for a time; the specific effect on Ammon is not described, but he becomes fully converted to the Gospel and desires to serve as a missionary to the Lamanites. 120 b.c. to 76 b.c.

=== Successful mission ===
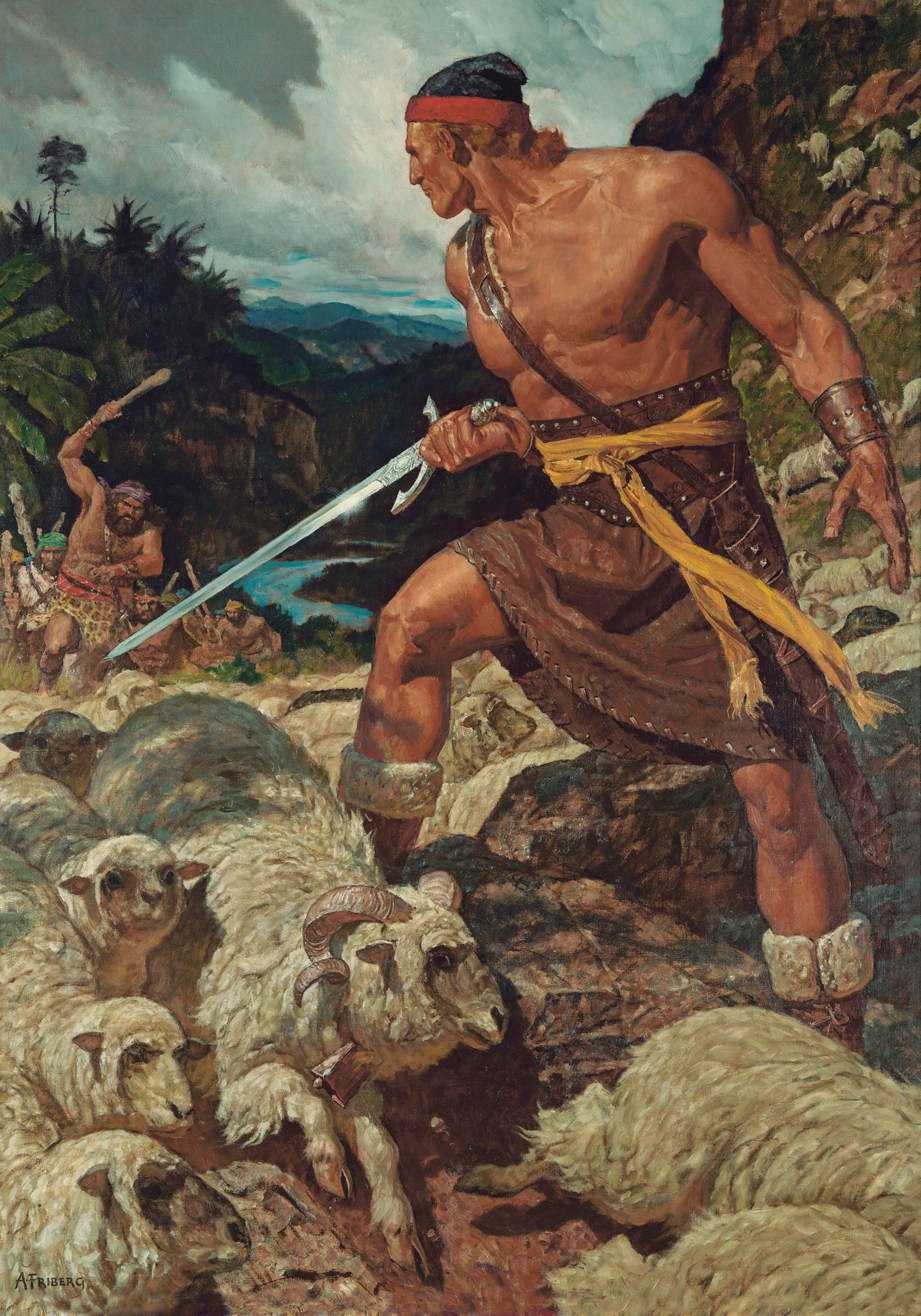
Ammon Defends the Flocks of King Lamoni, a painting by Arnold Friberg

Ammon and his brothers spend several years teaching the Gospel to the Lamanites. Ammon goes first to the land of Ishmael. He is captured by the Lamanites and taken before their king, Lamoni. Lamoni asks his purpose in straying so far from Nephite lands. When Ammon replies that he wants to live among Lamoni's people, the king, impressed, offers him one of his daughters. Ammon refuses but becomes a servant in the king's household, assisting others in caring for the king's flocks.

When bandits attack, Ammon directs the others to encircle the flock so they will not scatter and confronts the bandits. Fellow servants tell him they will be killed if the bandits acquire any of the flock. As he is seemingly outnumbered, the thieves attack Ammon. From a distance he kills several with his sling and then in hand-to-hand combat cuts off the arms of every robber who attacks him. Ammon's defense of the King's flock convinces the servants and the king that he is favored by God. The king, his household, and the entire kingdom convert to the Gospel.

Later, Ammon's love and respect for Lamoni impresses Lamoni's father, the king of all the Lamanites. As a result, the Lamanite king accepts the teachings of Aaron, Ammon's brother, and is converted. The Lamanites converted as a result of Ammon's ministry are called the "Anti-Nephi-Lehies" until they change their name to the People of Ammon after their migration to the Nephite land of Jershon. They swear to never take up arms again (and never do), although the two thousand stripling warriors are later recruited from among their sons.

== See also ==
- Ammon, Idaho
