= Captain Moroni =

Book of Mormon military leader

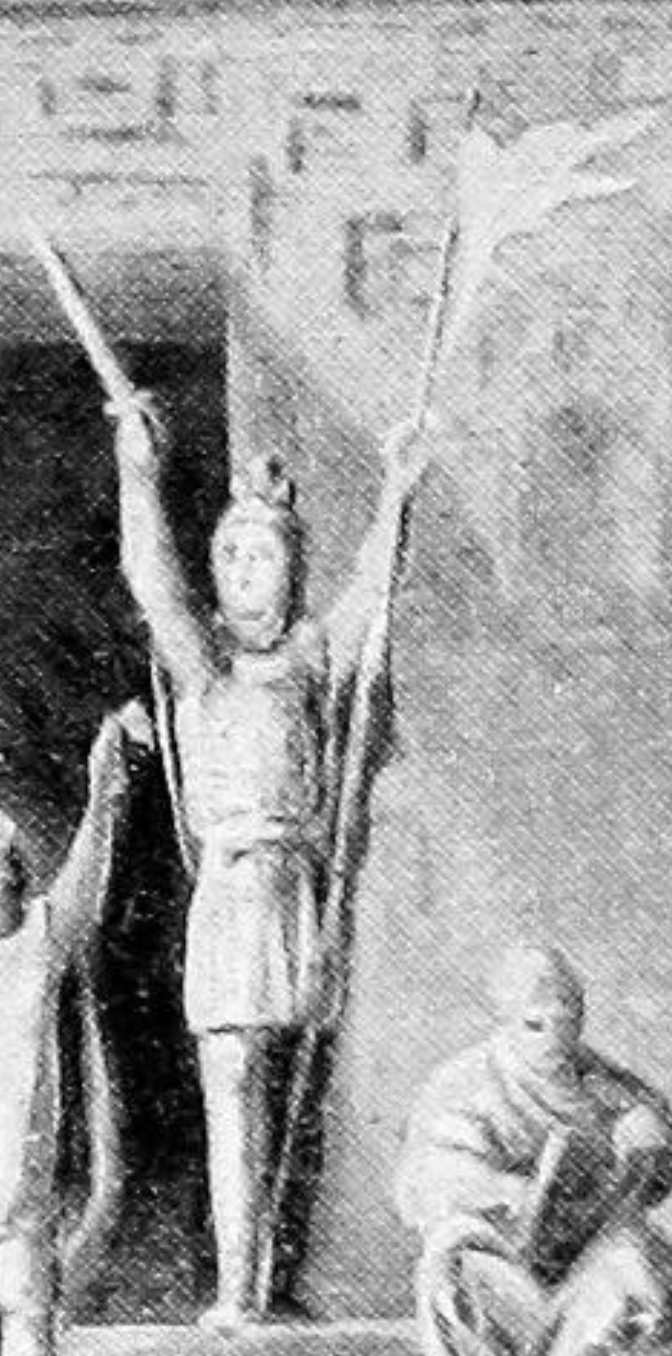
- Cropped from George M. Ottinger's 1888 Moroni Raises the "Title of Liberty"

Personal life
- Children: Moronihah
- Era: Reign of the judges (in the Book of Mormon)

Senior posting
- Successor: Moronihah

Military service
- Rank: Chief Captain
- Commands: Nephite military
- Battles/wars: Zoramite War; Amalickiahite Wars

According to the Book of Mormon, Captain Moroni was an important Nephite military commander who lived during the first century BC. He is first mentioned in the Book of Alma as "the chief captain over the Nephites."

Captain Moroni is presented as a righteous and skilled military commander. Among his accomplishments were his extensive preparations for battle and his fierce defense of the right of the Nephites to govern themselves and worship as they saw fit.

Captain Moroni shares a name with the prophet Moroni; the former is indexed in the Book of Mormon as Moroni^{1}.

== Narrative ==
In Alma 43:16, the Nephites appoint Moroni, twenty-five years old, to be chief captain of their armies. Moroni leads the Nephite military in the Zoramite War (Alma 43–44) and the Amalickiahite Wars (Alma 46–62).

=== Early command ===
Moroni is appointed in response to a looming war with Lamanites and Zoramites, a force led by Zerahemnah that included many Nephite dissenters. The Lamanite army attacked the Nephites in the land of Jershon and the battle ended on the banks of the river Sidon. In this war, Moroni set to work readying the Nephite people with body armor for the first time. He sent spies to investigate the Lamanites' weaknesses, and then he led his troops with the plan to surround those of the Lamanites. Moroni's overriding objective was to defend his people and their right to worship their God as they pleased. Ultimately, Moroni met that objective, which resulted in keeping many of the Lamanites from ever coming to combat against the Nephites again.

Moroni introduced to the Nephites revolutionary strategies in military tactics, safety, and precaution. He kept the people physically safe while he prayed, guiding and leading his armies by divine intervention. He was also known by his people for his firm ideology and integrity and his constant willingness to support the causes of personal freedom gaining the people's trust.

=== Title of Liberty ===
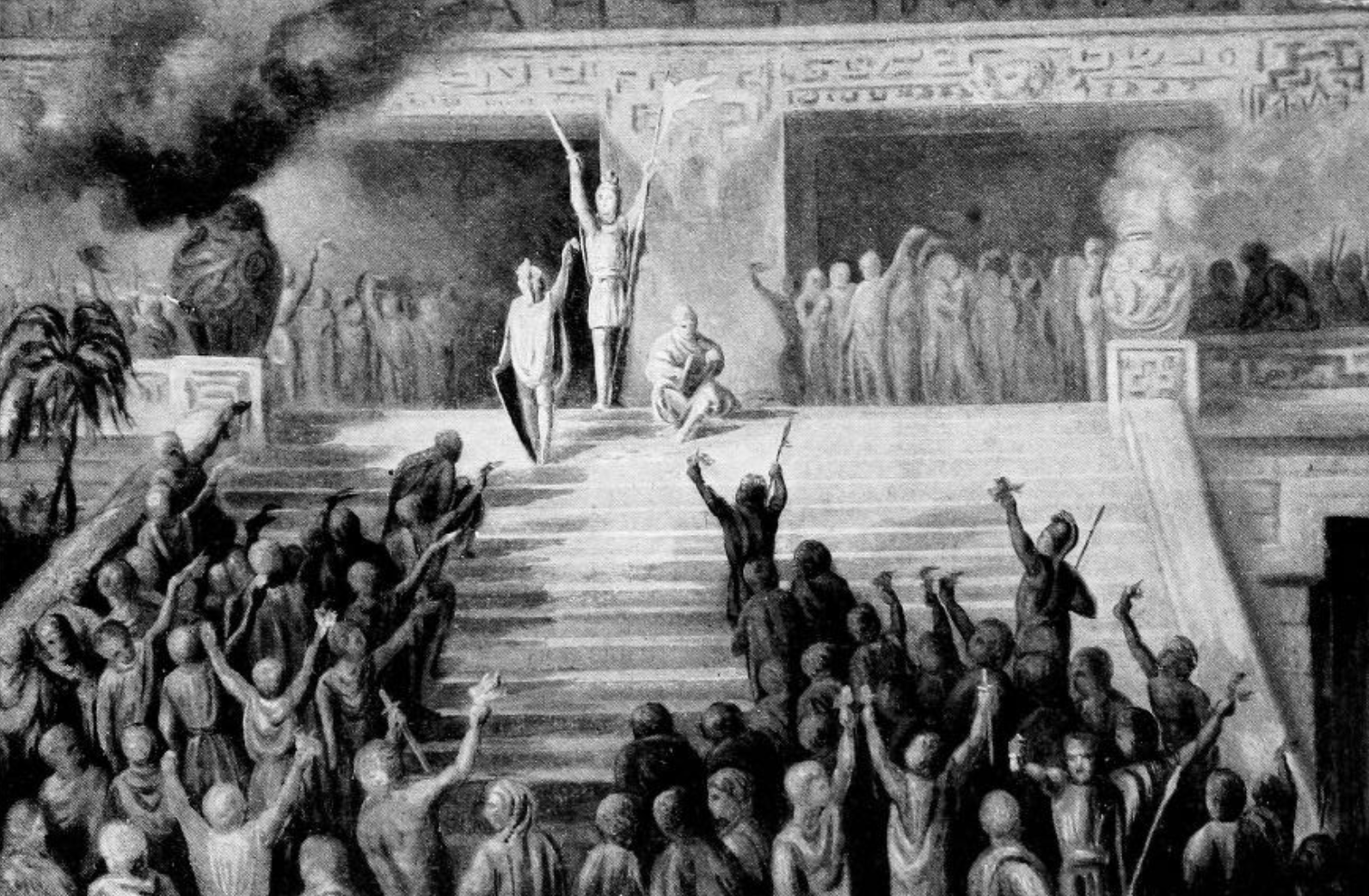
George M. Ottinger's Moroni Raises the "Title of Liberty", published in The Story of the Book of Mormon (1888)

Moroni is associated with the "title of liberty", a standard that he raised to rally the Nephites to defend their liberties from a group of dissenters who wanted to establish their leader as a king. Moroni was so angry with Amalickiah's dissension and wicked influence that he tore his coat and wrote upon it, "In memory of our God, our religion, and freedom, and our peace, our wives, and our children." With those words, he rallied his people to defend their families and their freedom and drive out the armies of Amalickiah. Moroni put to death any dissenters who did not flee and would not support the cause of freedom, and his "title of liberty" was raised over every Nephite tower.

According to the Book of Mormon, Moroni sought to strengthen the Nephites spiritually to be better prepared against the Lamanites, leading Mormon to comment on Moroni's righteousness.

=== King-men ===
Years later, Moroni encountered problems with a group of men called "king-men", who were so called because they wanted to replace the chief judge and democracy with a king, an aim seen as destroying the liberty of the people. Moroni had written to Pahoran for help in the war, and the Lamanites attacked before the help could arrive. Moroni wrote again, chastising Pahoran in the process for failing to respond, even threatening to "stir up insurrections" against what he perceived to be the nonresponsive government authorities. Pahoran wrote back, saying that the king-men had driven him from the judgment seat, and he had been unable to respond to Moroni's requests for assistance. Moroni left command of his armies in the hands of his deputies and led an insurrection of the people against the king-men. The leader of the king-men, Pachus, was killed and his followers were taken prisoner. Moroni and Pahoran regained control of the city of Nephihah, which they had lost, restoring the previous form of government by judges.

=== Retirement ===
After fortifying the Nephites' lands, Moroni transferred command of his armies to his son Moronihah and permanently retired to his own home. Four years later, in the 36th year of the reign of the judges (or around 56 BC), Moroni died. According to the chronology of years, listing the time from when Moroni took command of the armies at 25, he would have been about 45 when he died.

== Reception ==
=== Rhetoric ===
The narrative of Captain Moroni plays a significant role in how members of the LDS Church understand and justify the political realities of war and violence. In this context, important aspects of Moroni's narrative include that he "did not delight in the shedding of blood," his warfare was strictly defensive, he sought the guidance of prophets before battle, and he did not seek for power. When the U.S.-led War in Afghanistan commenced during the LDS Church's October 2001 General Conference, Church President Gordon B. Hinckley referenced the story of Captain Moroni saying, "There are times when we must stand up for right and decency, for freedom and civilization, just as Moroni rallied his people in his day to the defense of their wives, their children, and the cause of liberty."

Some Latter-day Saint authors, such as Nicholeen P. Peck, have drawn comparisons between the lives of Captain Moroni and General George Washington. Peck writes, "Many many years before George Washington, Captain Moroni did the same thing George Washington did. He wrote the Title of Liberty, and put on his military uniform, to show he would fight for his liberties if it was necessary." Mormon writer Heather Hemingway makes similar observations by noting, "Captain Moroni’s humility and valor is similar to that of George Washington during the winter of 1777–1778."

On October 28, 2020, United States Senator Mike Lee, a Latter-day Saint from Utah, compared President Donald Trump to Captain Moroni. Lee told rallygoers in Arizona: "To my Mormon friends, my Latter-day Saint friends, think of him as Captain Moroni." Lee went on to say that the president "seeks not the praise of the world" and wants only "the well-being and peace of the American people." Lee's comparison was met with extensive backlash. The overwhelming majority of comments on Lee's Facebook accounts found it to be "shameful" or "blasphemous." In a follow-up Facebook post, Lee pointed out that he had praised Trump for his willingness to "threaten the established political order" in spite of the "constant ridicule and scorn" to which this has subjected him and his family. To those who were offended by any suggestion that Trump should be held up as an example of personal righteousness, Lee wrote: "Finally, in no way did I suggest that people should seek to emulate President Trump in the same way they might pattern their lives after Captain Moroni."

=== Militancy ===
Cliven Bundy, an antigovernment activist and a member of the LDS Church, has frequently made references to the Book of Mormon in his conflicts with the U.S. government. According to Oregon Public Broadcasting, during the Bundy family’s 2014 occupation of federally owned lands in Nevada, Bundy used banners quoting Moroni: "In memory of our God, our religion, and freedom, and our peace, our wives, and our children."

In 2016, Ammon Bundy, a son of Cliven, used much of the same language as his father, "mixing Mormon religious symbolism with a disgust of the federal government," during an occupation of the Malheur National Wildlife Refuge. One member of Bundy's antigovernment extremist group refused to give any other name to the press than "Captain Moroni, from Utah." The man calling himself "Captain Moroni" was later identified in media reports and a criminal complaint as 34-year-old Dylan Wade Anderson.

On January 4, 2016, the LDS Church released a statement strongly condemning the armed seizure of the facility by the antigovernment activists in the standoff at the wildlife refuge, expressing deep concern the activists were suggesting their actions were justified on a scriptural basis, and affirming American civic life provides for peaceful resolution of conflict between government and private groups, according to the laws of the land.

On January 6, 2021, a banner copying the Title of Liberty was displayed by those attacking the U.S. Capitol. That evening, the church released a statement. "We peacefully accept the results of elections. We will not participate in the violence threatened by those disappointed with the outcome," Dallin H. Oaks said. "In a democratic society, we always have the opportunity and the duty to persist peacefully until the next election."

== Sources ==
- Davis, Ryan W. (2007). "For the Peace of the People: War and Democracy in the Book of Mormon". Journal of Book of Mormon Studies. 16 (1): 42–55, 85–86. doi:10.5406/jbookmormstud.16.1.0042.
- Hardy, Grant (2010). Understanding the Book of Mormon: A Reader's Guide. Oxford University Press. ISBN 9780199745449.
- Moran, Oralyn (2014). "Moroni and Pahoran". Religious Educator. 15 (3): 103–115.
- Perry, Michael F. (2015). "The Supremacy of the Word: Alma's Mission to the Zoramites and the Conversion of the Lamanites". Journal of Book of Mormon Studies. 24: 119–137. doi:10.5406/jbookmormstud2.24.2015.0119.
- Thorne, Melvin J. (1992). "Moroni_{1}". In Ludlow, Daniel H. (ed.). Encyclopedia of Mormonism. Macmillan. pp. 955–956. ISBN 0-02-879602-0.

Preceded by Zoram	Nephite military leader From the 18th year of the reign of the judges, or c. 74 BC, to the 31st–35th years, or 60–57 BC	Succeeded by Moronihah
