= King Mosiah II =

Book of Mormon character

In the Book of Mormon, Mosiah (/moʊˈsaɪ.ə, -ˈzaɪ.ə/), King Benjamin's son and Mosiah I's grandson, is king of the Nephite nation from about 124 BC to 91 BC. The Book of Mosiah is named after Mosiah. Mosiah is also a prophet and is described by Ammon as a seer who can translate records.

== Narration ==
Mosiah is one of the sons of King Benjamin. The Book of Mormon says he is well educated in the languages of his ancestors, the records on the brass plates, and the records on the plates of Nephi. When King Benjamin is about to die, he asks Mosiah to be the next king and gives him the plates of brass, the plates of Nephi, the sword of Laban, and the Liahona. All the people gather and Mosiah is named king at the age of thirty. He first sends a group of twelve men to the land of Lehi-Nephi to follow up on the others who had traveled there previously under the direction of Zeniff. Mosiah reigns in peace for three years and encourages his people to work the land, working alongside them to avoid being a burden.

At this point, the group he had sent towards Lehi-Nephi has helped the people of Zeniff, now led by Zeniff's grandson Limhi, escape from the Lamanites. They travel to Zarahemla and are welcomed into Mosiah's protection, followed shortly later by the people of Alma who had also escaped from Lamanite control. King Mosiah gathers all the people together to share the records of Zeniff and Alma. He also gives Alma authority to organize churches in the land, but members of the younger generation work to draw away the believers, including Mosiah's own sons. He declares to his people that they should all be equal and everyone should work to support themselves, which leads to another period of peace.

Mosiah's sons, who had earlier worked against the church, had converted and gone off to convert the Lamanites. Because none of them want to be king, Mosiah gathers the records he has access to, including the plates of brass, the plates of Nephi, all of his own writings, and the twenty four plates brought by Limhi's people. He translates the twenty four plates, which talk about people who came from the Tower of Babel. He then gives all of these records to Alma the Younger, and instructs him to keep his own records as well. Mosiah warns his people against the dangers of a bad king and suggests they instead use a system of judges.

== Sons of Mosiah ==
The sons of Mosiah is the collective name used in the Book of Mormon for four sons of King Mosiah II, whose names were Ammon, Aaron, Omner, and Himni. These sons were notable for their initial opposition to the church, their miraculous repentance and conversion to Christ. They subsequently served as missionaries among the Lamanites, accompanied by their friends Muloki and Ammah.

== Interpretation ==
=== Leadership rights ===
Grant Hardy proposes that Mosiah's suggestion to use a system of judges stems not only from the danger of a bad king but also from concerns over who held the right to the throne. As Zarahemla's past leaders came from the line of King Zedekiah, their descendants could have put Mosiah's authority in question.

Michael Austin suggests the decision to switch to the system of judges shows fear of civil war on King Mosiah's part. The Book of Mormon takes up the record over fifty years after the merger with the statement that there is no longer contention among the people of Zarahemla, hinting at prior contentions. King Benjamin instructs Mosiah to gather the people of Zarahemla and the Nephites together which implies they live in two separate groups. Pre-existing tension means when none of his sons want to take the throne, Mosiah naming any other king would leave space for other claims to the throne and additional political unrest. This concern carries through to the conflicts in the book of Alma and Helaman which, writes Austin, come from the forced distinction of Nephite culture over that of Zarahemla.

== Sources cited ==
- Thomas, John Christopher (2016). A Pentecostal Reads the Book of Mormon: A Literary and Theological Introduction. CPT Press. ISBN 978-1-935931-55-3. Wikidata Q123196681.

Preceded by King Benjamin for his own tribe, and Limhi for his tribe	King of the Nephites; 124–91 BC	Succeeded by Alma, son of Alma, as chief judge and military leader
Preceded by King Benjamin	Nephite record keeper 124 – c. 92 BC	Succeeded by Alma, son of Alma
