= Ezra Meeker =

American pioneer (1830–1928)

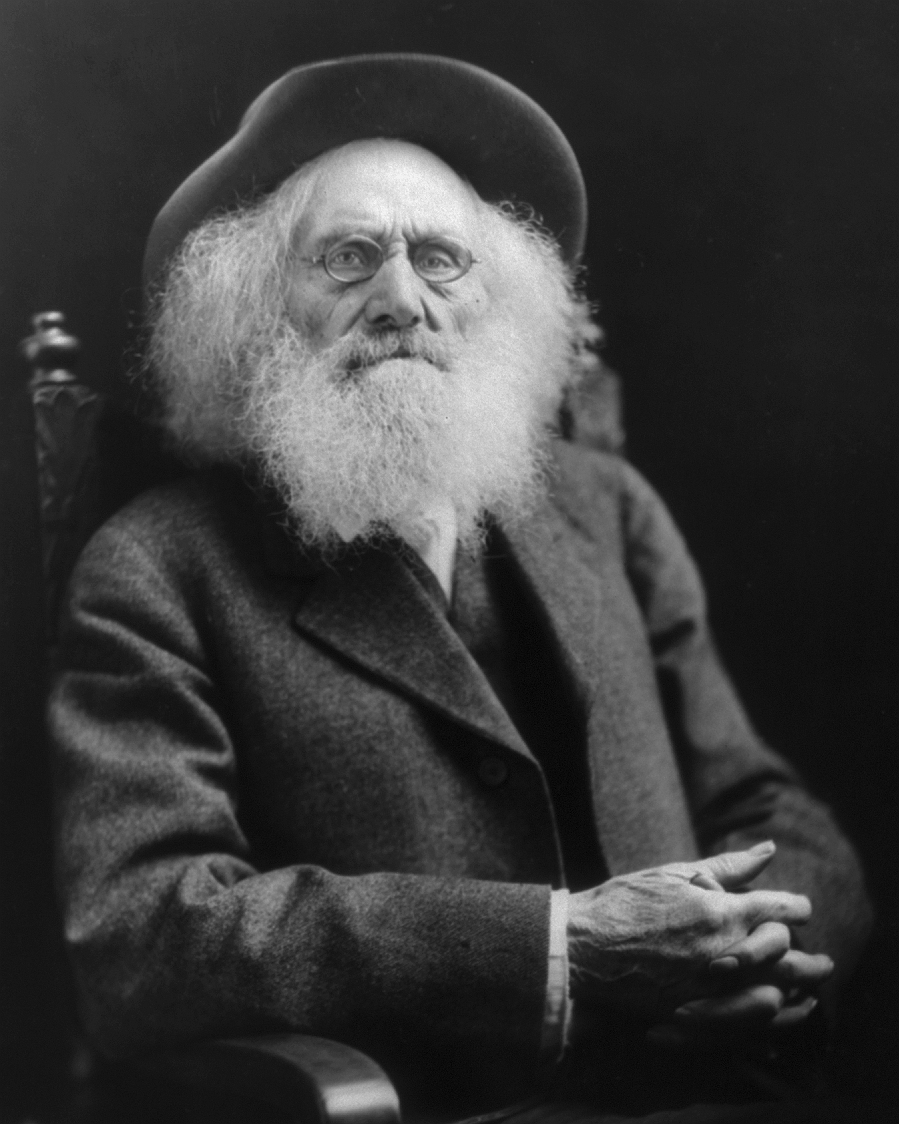
- Meeker in 1921

1st Mayor of Puyallup, Washington
- In office August 1890 – January 1891
- Preceded by: Office established
- Succeeded by: James Mason
- In office January 1892 – January 1893
- Preceded by: James Mason
- Succeeded by: L. W. Hill

1st Postmaster of Puyallup, Washington Territory
- In office 1877–1882
- Preceded by: Office established
- Succeeded by: Marion Meeker

Personal details
- Born: Ezra Morgan Meeker; December 29, 1830 Butler County, Ohio, U.S.
- Died: December 3, 1928 (aged 97) Seattle, Washington, U.S.
- Resting place: Woodbine Cemetery, Puyallup, Washington, U.S. 47°10′14″N 122°18′8″W
- Party: Republican
- Spouse: Eliza Jane Sumner (m. 1851; died 1909)
- Children: 6
- Occupation: Farmer
- Nicknames: Uncle Ezra; Father Ezra

Ezra Morgan Meeker (Note: Many give his middle name as Manning, however, a letter from his brother, John Valentine Meeker, provides his middle name as Morgan.) (December 29, 1830 – December 3, 1928) was an American pioneer who traveled the Oregon Trail by ox-drawn wagon as a young man, migrating from Iowa to the Pacific Coast. Later in life he worked to memorialize the Trail, repeatedly retracing the trip of his youth. Once known as the "Hop King of the World", he was the first mayor of Puyallup, Washington.

Meeker was born in Butler County, Ohio, to Jacob and Phoebe Meeker. His family relocated to Indiana when he was a boy. He married Eliza Jane Sumner in 1851; the following year the couple, with their newborn son and Ezra's brother, set out for the Oregon Territory, where land could be claimed and settled on. Although they endured hardships on the Trail in the journey of nearly six months, the entire party survived the trek. Meeker and his family briefly stayed near Portland, then journeyed north to live in the Puget Sound region. They settled at what is now Puyallup in 1862, where Meeker grew hops for use in brewing beer. By 1887, his business had made him wealthy, and his wife built a large mansion for the family. In 1891, an infestation of hop aphids destroyed his crops and took much of his fortune. He later tried his hand at a number of ventures, and made four largely unsuccessful trips to the Klondike, taking groceries and hoping to profit from the gold rush.

Meeker became convinced that the Oregon Trail was being forgotten, and he became determined to bring it publicity so it could be marked and monuments erected. In 1906–1908, while in his late 70s, he retraced his steps along the Oregon Trail by wagon, seeking to build monuments in communities along the way. His trek reached New York City, and in Washington, D.C., he met President Theodore Roosevelt. He traveled the Trail again several times in the final two decades of his life, including by oxcart in 1910–1912 and by airplane in 1924. During another such trip, in 1928, Meeker fell ill but was helped by Henry Ford. On his return to Washington state, Meeker became ill again and died there on December 3, 1928, at the age of 97. Meeker wrote several books; his work has continued through the activities of such groups as the Oregon-California Trails Association.

== Early life ==
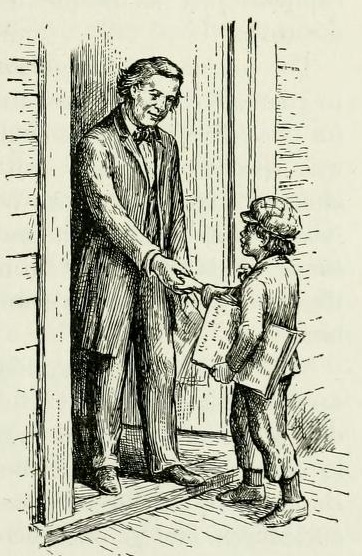
Drawing of Meeker delivering a newspaper to Henry Ward Beecher

Ezra Morgan Meeker was born in Butler County, Ohio, near Huntsville, on December 29, 1830, to Jacob (1804–1869) and Phoebe Meeker (née Baker; 1801–1854). His paternal ancestors had been among the early settlers of Elizabeth, New Jersey, where their ancestral home was located. In the American Revolutionary War, about twenty Meekers fought for the new nation. Ezra was the fourth of the six children Jacob and Phoebe had while together, with older brothers John, Manning (died at age one week) and Oliver, and a younger sister Hannah and brother Clark.

Jacob was a miller and farmer. In 1839, the family moved from Ohio to Indiana, close to Indianapolis—Ezra and his older brother Oliver walked behind the family wagon for 200 miles (320 km). Ezra had little formal education; he later estimated a total of six months. Phoebe, seeing that her son's mind was not well adapted to formal learning, allowed him to earn money through odd jobs. He obtained work as printer's devil at the Indianapolis Journal, where his duties involved delivering the newspaper to subscribers, among them local pastor Henry Ward Beecher. In 1845, Phoebe's father, a Cincinnati merchant, gave his daughter $1,000 (about $32,000 in 2024) enough to buy the family a farm. As both Jacob and Ezra Meeker realized the boy enjoyed the outdoor life more than inside work, Jacob placed Ezra in charge of the farm, allowing the elder Meeker to work as a miller.

== Migration to Oregon Territory (1852) ==
Ezra Meeker married his childhood sweetheart, Eliza Jane Sumner, in May 1851. The Sumners lived about four miles (6 km) from Indianapolis, and like the Meekers were family farmers who did not hire help. When he asked her for her hand, he told her he wanted to farm, which she accepted as long as it was on their own property. In October 1851, the couple set out for Eddyville, Iowa, where they rented a farm. They had heard that land in Eddyville would be free, but this was not the case. Ezra, working in a surveyor's camp, decided that he did not like Iowa's winters—a prejudice shared by his pregnant wife. Reports were circulating through the prairies about the Oregon Territory's free land and mild climate. Also influencing the decision was the urging of Oliver Meeker who, with friends, had outfitted for the trip to Oregon near Indianapolis, and had come to Eddyville to recruit his brother. Ezra and Eliza Jane Meeker vacillated on the decision, and it was not until early April 1852, more than a month after the birth of their son Marion, that they decided to travel the Oregon Trail.

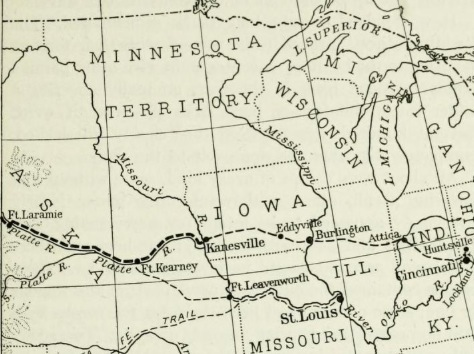
The eastern half of Meeker's migration, as far as Fort Laramie

That April, Ezra, Eliza Jane, Oliver, and Marion Meeker set out to journey to Oregon, some 2,000 miles (3,200 km) in all. With their wagon, they had two yokes of oxen, one of cows and an extra cow. They were accompanied by William Buck, who would remain with them much of the way before separating from them to go to California. Buck outfitted the wagon, Meeker selected the animals, and with his wife carefully prepared food supplies. The wagons of Meeker's grouping traveled together by informal agreement; there was no wagon master in overall charge.

A number of Oliver Meeker's friends from Indianapolis joined the group before the party left Iowa. They crossed the Missouri River at the small Mormon settlement of Kanesville (today Council Bluffs, Iowa). Meeker recounted that, as he stood on the far side of the Missouri, he felt as if he had left the United States. As they journeyed westward along the Platte River in Nebraska Territory, there were such large numbers traveling that they were never out of sight of the tens of thousands of other pioneers journeying west that year. Sometimes several wagons advanced side by side. The Meekers chose a slow, steady pace, unlike many who sought to rush along as quickly as possible. Piles of abandoned possessions lined the way, cast aside to lighten loads. As the party went further west, they passed some of those who had hurried past them, and whose wagons had broken down or whose oxen had died as a result of failure to care for them properly. Disease was an ever-present risk; at the present site of Kearney, Nebraska, Oliver Meeker was stricken with illness. This led to a division of the group when most of Oliver's friends, including later Idaho Territory governor David W. Ballard, refused to wait. Oliver recovered after four days, and was one of the lucky ones—his brother later estimated that one in ten of those who took the Trail perished during the journey. Ezra Meeker remembered meeting one wagon train, slowly moving east against the flow of traffic. That group had made it as far as Fort Laramie (today in Wyoming) before losing the last of its menfolk, and the women and children turned back, hoping to regain their homes in the East. He never learned if they made it. According to local historians Bert and Margie Webber, "all of these deaths made a great impression on the young man".

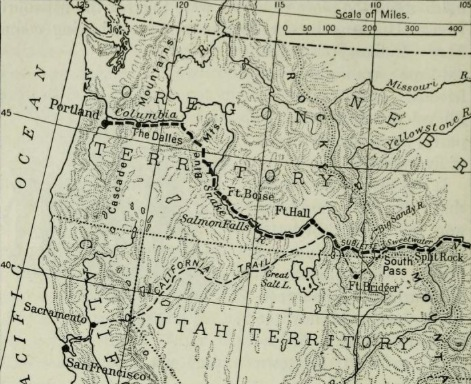
The western half of Meeker's migration

They encountered Native Americans, who would sometimes demand provisions for passage, but none were given and none of the incidents ended with violence. The travelers' stores were supplemented by shooting bison, which roamed the Great Plains in huge numbers. Despite being a source of food, the bison were a danger as their stampedes could destroy property and kill irreplaceable stock. In southeastern Idaho, the California Trail separated from the Oregon, and Buck and some of the rest of the party split off there; they settled in California and remained friends with Meeker until their deaths.

Meeker found that the final stretch between Fort Boise and The Dalles was the most difficult. The section is filled with mountains and deserts, and there was little chance of supplementing stores. Those who entered this 350-mile (560 km) segment with exhausted teams or minimal supplies often died along it. Others shed baggage brought across half a continent, saving only provisions. Parties who feared this part of the journey sometimes tried to float down the Snake and Columbia Rivers; many were wrecked in the rapids and died. At The Dalles, where river passage was available to Portland, the Meeker party found a motley crowd of emigrants. With the money earned at the ferry, they booked passage downriver. Oliver Meeker brought the livestock ahead overland, and met Ezra and his family on their arrival in Portland on October 1, 1852, where they slept inside a house for the first time since leaving Iowa. Ezra Meeker had lost 20 pounds (9 kg) and possessed $2.75 in cash. All of the party survived, although Jacob Davenport, one of Oliver Meeker's friends from Indiana, became ill on the final part of the trip and died some weeks after reaching Portland. All but one of the livestock completed the trip—a cow was lost while crossing the Missouri River. Ezra Meeker considered his journey over the Oregon Trail to have been the making of him as a man.

== Territorial pioneer ==
=== Early days ===
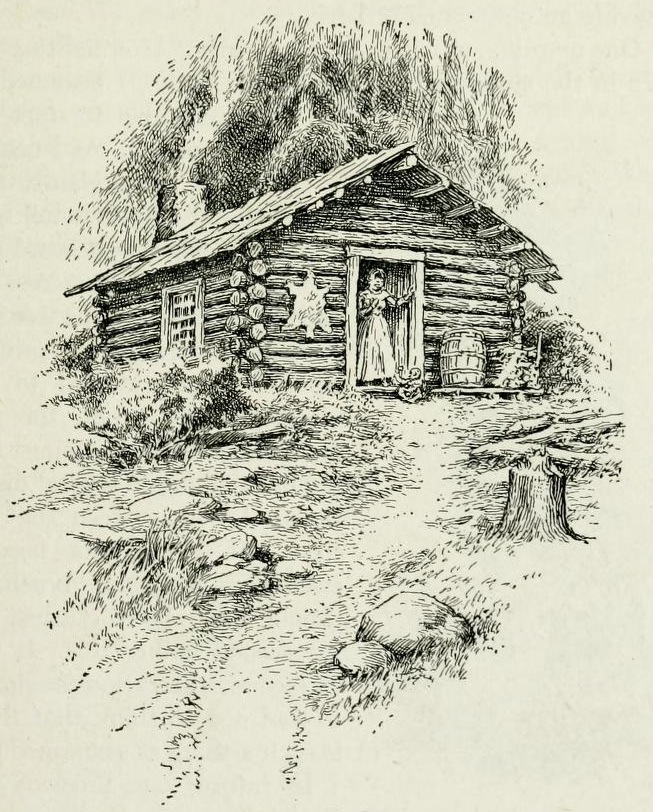
Meeker's cabin at Kalama

Meeker's first employment in the Pacific Northwest was unloading a ship that had docked at Portland. He moved to the nearby town of St. Helens, where construction of a wharf in competition with Portland's was under way—Oliver rented a house to lodge workers in, and Ezra went to help his brother. By this time, Ezra Meeker and his wife were determined to fulfill their original plan to farm, and when work was abandoned on the wharf, he went to find land which could be cultivated.

Meeker first made a claim in January 1853 about 40 miles (60 km) downriver from Portland, on the current site of Kalama, Washington. There, he built a log cabin and began his first farm. He did not build close to the water, which proved fortunate as there was a major flood on the Columbia soon after he claimed the land. Instead, he profited from the incident, selling logs the river left on his claim, together with trees he chopped down, for lumber.

In April 1853, Meeker heard that the lands north of the Columbia would become a separate territory (named Washington Territory), with its capital on Puget Sound, an inlet of the Pacific. He decided to travel north with his brother to scout for lands to claim around the waterway. There were as yet only about 500 European-descended inhabitants in the Puget Sound region, of which 100 were in the village of Olympia, which would become the territorial (and later state) capital. Despite there only being a few settlers, there was considerable activity in the area—the lumber of Puget Sound fueled San Francisco's building boom. The Meekers' first view of Puget Sound was unprepossessing; the tide was out, exposing mud flats. Nevertheless, they pressed on, building a skiff to travel by water. They were met by friendly Indians, who sold them clams and taught them how to cook the shellfish. Engaging one of the Native Americans as a guide, they explored the area, looking for good, well-located farmland. At one point, they entered the Puyallup River, in a region where no white settlers lived, and camped on the present site of Puyallup, but were deterred by the large number of huge trees, which would make it difficult to clear land for farming. They decided on tracts on McNeil Island, not far from the thriving town of Steilacoom, where the farm's produce could be sold. Oliver remained on the island to build a cabin while his brother went back to fetch family and possessions, and sell their old claims at Kalama. He returned to a cabin in which they installed a glass window that looked over the water to Steilacoom, with a view of Mount Rainier. The Meeker claim was later the site of McNeil Island Corrections Center.

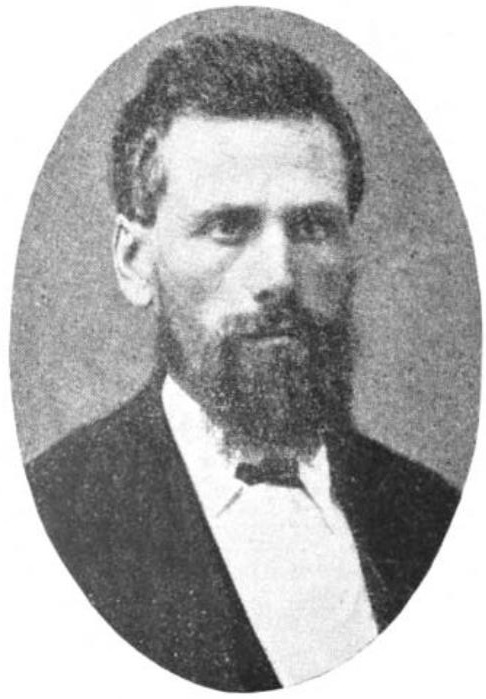
Meeker at age 23 in 1854

Later in 1853, Ezra and Oliver Meeker received a three-month-old letter from their father, stating that he and other family members wanted to emigrate, and would do so if Oliver Meeker could return to assist them. They immediately responded that Oliver would return to Indiana by early the following year, and put their plans on hold to prepare for and finance his journey by steamship and rail. In August 1854, Ezra Meeker received word that his relatives were en route, but were delayed and short on provisions. He quickly went to their aid, intending to guide them through the Naches Pass into the Puget Sound area. When he found his family's party close to the first Fort Walla Walla (near Richland, Washington), he learned that his mother and a younger brother had died along the Trail. He guided the survivors through the pass and to his claim on McNeil Island.

Jacob Meeker saw only limited prospects on the island, and the family took claims near Tacoma, where they operated a general store in Steilacoom. On November 5, 1855, Ezra Meeker claimed 325.21 acres (131.61 ha) of land called Swamp Place, near Fern Hill, southeast of Tacoma. He began to improve the land, planting a garden and an orchard.

Pursuant to the 1854 Treaty of Medicine Creek, settlers purchased lands from the Indians. The agreement, signed under duress, restricted the Native Americans to inadequate reservations, and in 1855, the Puget Sound War broke out, bringing unrest to the region over the following two years. Ezra Meeker had maintained good relations with the Native Americans, and did not fight in the conflict, though he accompanied one expedition to recover possessions captured by the Indians. A controversial aspect of the war was the trials and hanging of Chief Leschi, deemed responsible for killing during the conflict. Meeker sat on the jury in the first trial, which resulted in a hung jury, with Meeker and another man holding out for acquittal on the grounds that Leschi was a combatant in wartime. A second trial convicted Leschi, and he was hanged. Meeker described the execution as wrongful, and in later years wrote of the incident. In 1895, Meeker chartered a special train to bring whites to Leschi's reburial on tribal land, and in 2004 the Washington State Senate passed a resolution that Leschi had been unjustly treated; a special historical tribunal made up of past and present justices of the Washington Supreme Court also exonerated Leschi as both he and the man he was said to have killed were combatants.

=== "Hop King of the World" ===
Ezra Meeker's farm at Swamp Place was not a success as the land was too poor to grow crops. The family continued to run the store in Steilacoom. On January 5, 1861, Oliver Meeker drowned while returning from a buying trip to San Francisco, when his ship, the Northerner, sank off the California coast. The Meekers had borrowed to finance the trip, and the losses from this disaster reduced Ezra Meeker to near penury. He secured the squatter's claim of Jerry Stilly on land in the Puyallup Valley, and moved his wife and children there in 1862. While clearing his own holdings, he earned money by helping to clear the land of others. His father and surviving brother, John Meeker, also had claims in the valley. John Meeker had come to Washington Territory by ship in 1859 and had settled in the Puyallup Valley. Ezra Meeker ran for the Washington Territorial Legislature in 1861, but was defeated. In 1869, Meeker ran for Pierce County Surveyor; he was defeated by James Gallagher, 138 votes to 116.

In 1865, Olympia brewer Isaac Wood imported some hop roots from the United Kingdom, hopeful that they would do well in the Pacific Northwest. As hops, used to flavor beer, were not then grown locally, the cost of transport from Britain or New York made his beer expensive, and he hoped Puget Sound-area farmers would grow hops and supply him. He was a friend of Jacob Meeker, and gave him the roots to grow. Jacob passed some of them on to Ezra. The plants grew extremely well, and at the end of the season, the Meekers earned $185 from selling Wood the crop. Such a sum was rarely seen in the Puyallup Valley at that time, and a hop-growing boom promptly began. Ezra Meeker, with his head start, was able to repeatedly expand operations, he eventually had 500 acres (200 ha) of hop-growing lands. He also built one of the first hop-drying kilns in the valley. For years Meeker supplied Portland brewer Henry Weinhard.

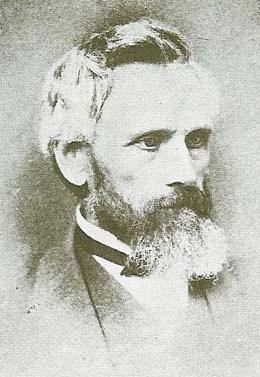
Meeker, circa 1880

The fertile soil and temperate climate of the valley proved ideal for hops. Not only did the plants thrive, farmers were able to obtain four or five times the usual yield. Meeker, never one to miss an opportunity, formed his own hop brokerage business. In 1870, he penned an 80-page pamphlet, Washington Territory West of the Cascades, to promote investment in the region. He took ship for San Francisco, then journeyed east by the new transcontinental railroad, hoping to get the railroads to expand to his region. He met with newspaper editor Horace Greeley (known for his famous advice, "Go West, young man") and with railroad mogul Jay Cooke as part of his promotional blitz. Cooke, who was building the Northern Pacific Railway to cross the northern tier of the country, not only bought up Meeker's pamphlets to give away to potential investors, but hired Meeker to drum up interest in his railroad. While working from a Manhattan office, Meeker dressed like city dwellers, but did not entirely lose his frontier habits, often stirring a lump of butter into his coffee.

In 1877, Meeker filed a plat for a townsite to surround his cabin. He named the town Puyallup, using the local Indian words for generous people, according to Meeker. The local post office had previously been called "Franklin", a common designation in the United States; Meeker, the town's first postmaster, stated that the new name was likely to remain unique. He later admitted that the pronunciation of Puyallup caused confusion when he visited England—it still remains difficult for non-locals. (Note: The Franklin post office was moved several miles in 1877 and its name changed in 1883 to Sumner.)

Meeker strove to improve life in the region, and donated land and money towards town buildings and parks, a theatre and a hotel while defraying the start-up costs of a wood products factory. The Ezra Meeker Historical Society, in their 1972 pamphlet on his life, wrote of his activities:

During those years, Mr. Meeker became a dynamic force in the community, and had a part in almost everything that happened in the valley. Restless, forceful, a natural leader, he became a prime mover, galvanizing the citizens of Puyallup into action on such vital problems as the building of streets, roads, homes, schools, and businesses and transforming the forest into one of the most progressive small communities in the state. If he was not leading an undertaking, he was sure to be a busy member of some committee working on it.

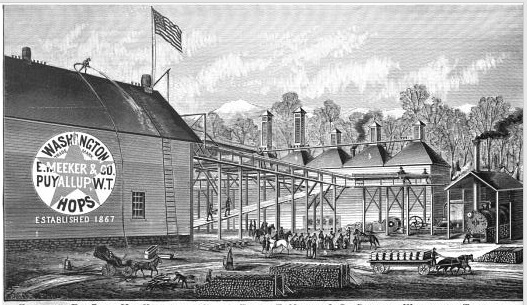
The domain of the Hop King

Hops made many farmers wealthy, including Meeker, who at one point claimed he had earned a half million dollars for his crop. In 1880, he wrote his first book, Hop Culture in the United States, and soon after became known as the "Hop King of the World". By the 1880s, he was the wealthiest man in the territory, and had formed a London branch of his hop brokerage. He served as Washington Territory's representative at the 1885–1886 North Central & South American Exposition in New Orleans; he also took exhibits to London's Colonial and Indian Exposition after the New Orleans fair closed. In 1886, Meeker sought the Republican nomination for territorial delegate to Congress, but was defeated after many ballots at the party convention. He became a supporter of women's suffrage, which was the subject of a long-running political battle in Washington Territory, a dispute which lasted well after statehood in 1889.

Eliza Jane felt that the family should live in a better house than their original cabin, and between 1887 and 1890 built what became known as the Meeker Mansion in Puyallup. The cost was $26,000, a very large sum at the time. An Italian artist lived with the Meekers for a year, painting careful details on the ceilings. The Meekers moved in during 1890, the same year Puyallup was formally incorporated under state law—they donated their old homesite to the town for a park. In 1890, Meeker served as first mayor of Puyallup. He was elected to a second, non-consecutive term for 1892.

== Ruin and Klondike ==
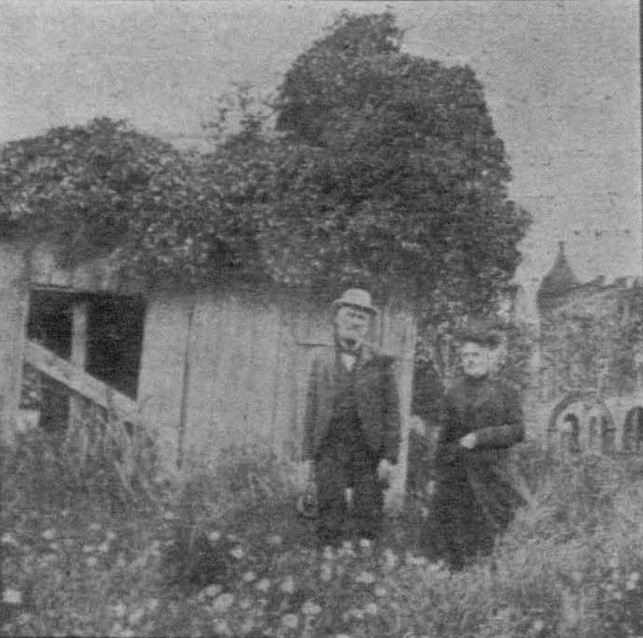
Ezra and Eliza Jane Meeker stand before their onetime cabin, Puyallup (c. 1890s).

In 1891, a blight of hop aphids struck the hop-growing West Coast from British Columbia to California. Although sprays of various liquids were used in an attempt to defeat the insects, use of such pesticides damaged the hops. In 1892, the crop decreased to half of what it had been before the infestation. Meeker had advanced money to many growers, who were unable to repay him. The problems in the valley were made worse by the Panic of 1893, a severe worldwide depression. Business after business in which Meeker had invested failed, such as the Puyallup Electric Light Company. He was overextended, and lost much of his fortune, and eventually his lands to foreclosure.

Meeker spent part of the winter of 1895–1896 in London, recouping what he could from his interests there. In the 1896 Klondike Gold Rush, gold was discovered both in Alaska and in Canada, and when Meeker returned from the United Kingdom, he found his sons, Marion and Fred, preparing to leave for Cook Inlet, Alaska. They found all the worthwhile claims had already been taken. Nevertheless, the Meeker family saw the finds as a possible road to financial recovery, and founded a company to buy and sell mining claims, though they knew little about the trade. In 1897, Meeker and his sons journeyed to the Kootenay country of southeastern British Columbia, where gold had been found. Despite the fact Meeker was aged 66, he undertook a full share of the labor. Both Meeker sons filed claims in Canada, but the mines required additional investment. Meeker raised money to travel to New York to speak with his old contacts, where he received more promises than cash. On the return leg he failed to raise money in visits in Illinois and Minneapolis and by July 1897, he was back in the Kootenays, working the claim. When the gold discovery in the Klondike in northwestern Canada was publicized that year, Meeker saw that as a better opportunity, and sent his son Fred to investigate. Fred Meeker returned with a report in November; the Meekers sought to finance a mining expedition to the Klondike, but failed to raise adequate money from investors.

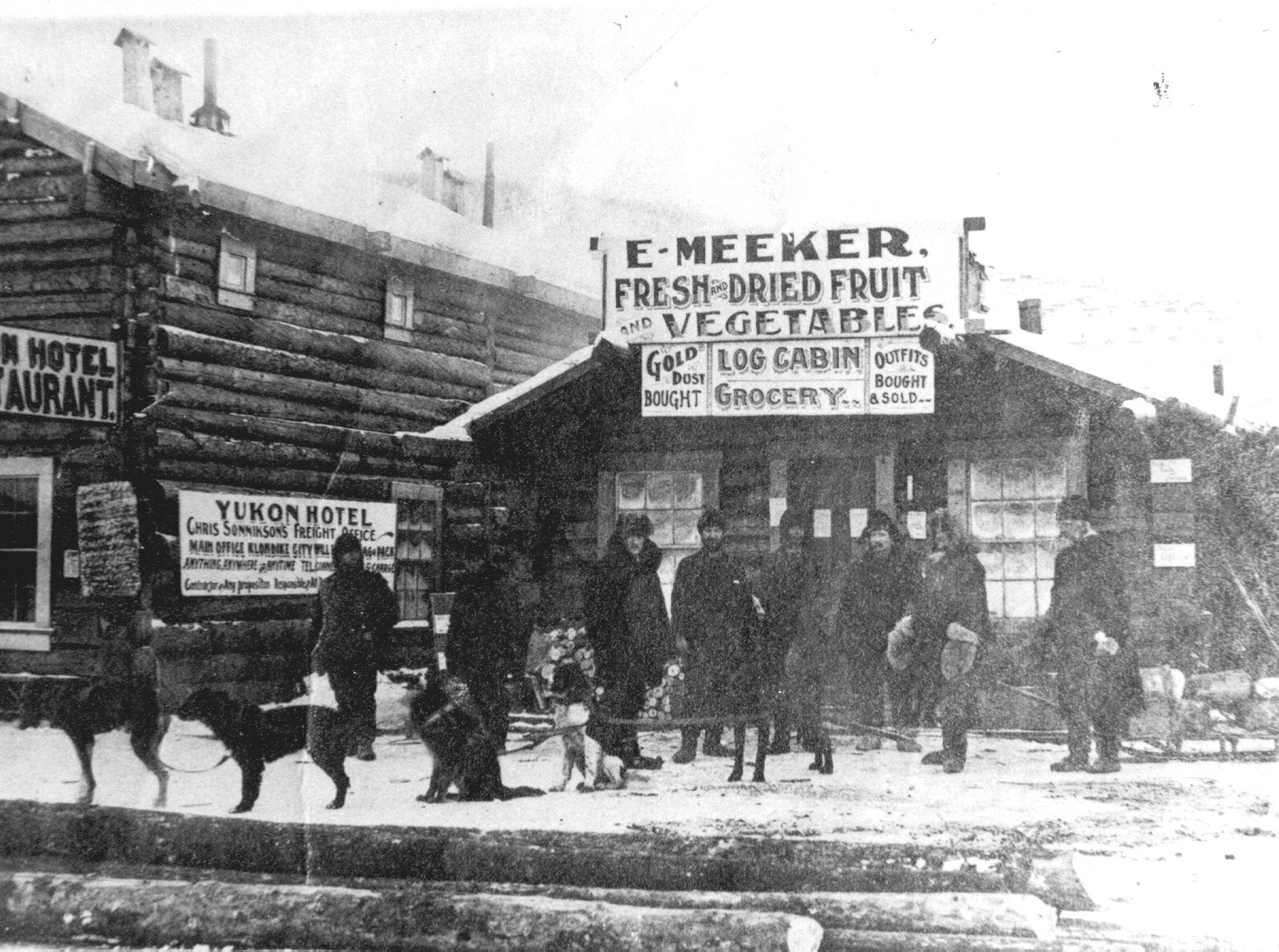
Meeker (right) and his first Klondike grocery store, Dawson City, Yukon, November 19, 1898.

Despite his inability to raise funds for mining, Meeker was certain there was a way to make money from the gold rush. He and Eliza Jane spent much of the winter of 1897–1898 drying vegetables, and Ezra Meeker departed for Skagway, Alaska, on March 20, 1898, with 30,000 pounds (14,000 kg) of dried produce—Fred Meeker and his wife Clara were already across the border in what would soon be designated as the Yukon Territory. The 67-year-old Meeker, with one business associate, climbed the steep Chilkoot Pass. With thousands of others in boats and on rafts, he floated down the Yukon River once the ice broke up in late May, and sold his vegetables in two weeks in Dawson City. He returned to Puyallup in July, only to set out again with more supplies the following month. This time, he and his son-in-law, Roderick McDonald, opened a store, the Log Cabin Grocery, in Dawson City, and remained through the winter.

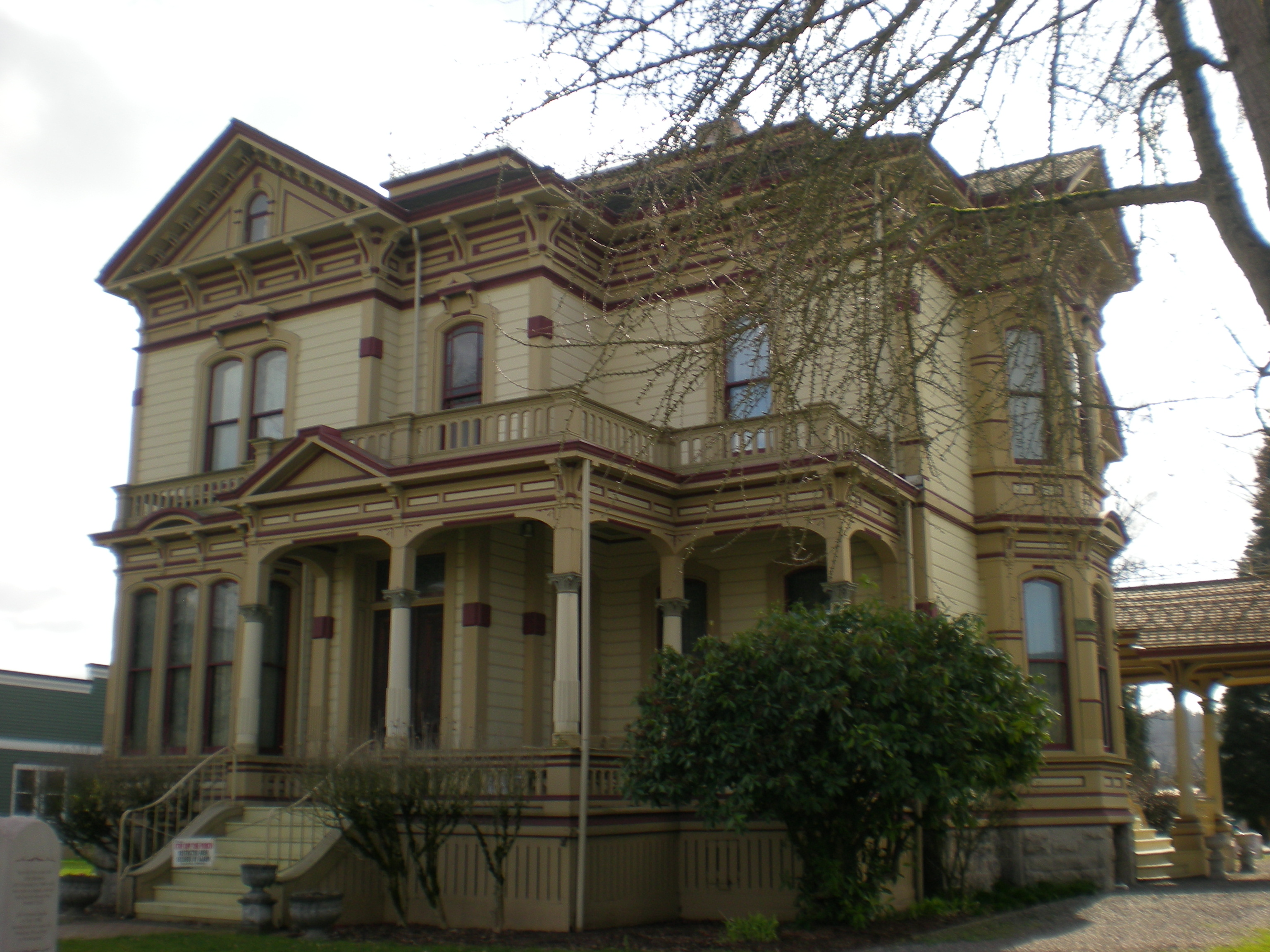
The Meeker Mansion (seen in 2008)

Meeker returned to the Yukon twice more, in 1899 and 1900. Most of the money earned through groceries was invested in gold mining, and was lost. When he departed the Klondike for the last time in April 1901, he left behind him the body of his son Fred, dead of pneumonia in Dawson City on January 30, 1901. In his writings, Meeker ascribed his sudden departure from the Yukon in 1901 to mining losses and his upcoming 50th wedding anniversary. Meeker scholar Dennis M. Larsen in his book on the pioneer's Klondike adventure suggests that a more likely reason was attempts by those who had lost money in Meeker's enterprises in the 1890s to gain the family's remaining major asset, the Meeker Mansion. That property was sold by Eliza Jane Meeker to her daughter Caroline and son-in-law Eben Osborne for $10,000 in mid-1901 (about $300,000 in 2024) and later that year both Ezra and Eliza Jane executed documents stating that the house had been her separate property, paid for with funds not deriving from Ezra. The sale to the Osbornes included provisions that Ezra and Eliza Jane were to have lifetime residence and $50 per month. Ezra Meeker did not live there after his wife's death in 1909, and the Osbornes sold the house in 1915. Eben Osborne died in 1922, survived by his 91-year-old father in law.

== Promoting the Trail ==
=== Preparation for 1906 trip ===
Meeker spent the years after the Klondike in Puyallup, where he wrote and served as president of the Washington State Historical Society, which he had helped to found in 1891. The Ezra Meeker Historical Society described their namesake's situation after the Klondike expeditions:

He was 71 years old. He had been an adventurer, laborer, surveyor, longshoreman, farmer, merchant, community leader, civic builder, richest man in the state, world traveler, miner and writer. He had made and lost millions. He had made money, not so much to hoard, but to do things with—to develop, control forces, build and promote. But his money was gone. It was generally assumed that he had finally come home to stay and live out his days in peace and quiet in his beautiful valley. Not so. He still had dreams.

Meeker had long contemplated the idea of marking the Oregon Trail, over which he had traveled in 1852, with granite monuments. By the early 20th century, he was convinced that the Trail was in danger of being forgotten. Farmers were plowing up the Trail bit by bit, and as towns and cities grew along it, the Trail vanished under streets and buildings. Meeker viewed its preservation as an urgent matter because of this slow disappearance. He wanted the Trail properly marked, and monuments erected to honor the dead.

Meeker came up with a scheme to travel along the Trail again by ox-drawn wagon, raising public awareness for his cause. He believed that public interest would provide enough money both to build markers and maintain himself along the way. Though many hucksters traveled by wagon, selling patent nostrums, Meeker felt that he would stand out, as an authentic pioneer able to tell real stories of the Trail—especially if he used authentic gear. He felt that it was likely that once newspapers got wind of his travels, they would give him ample coverage.

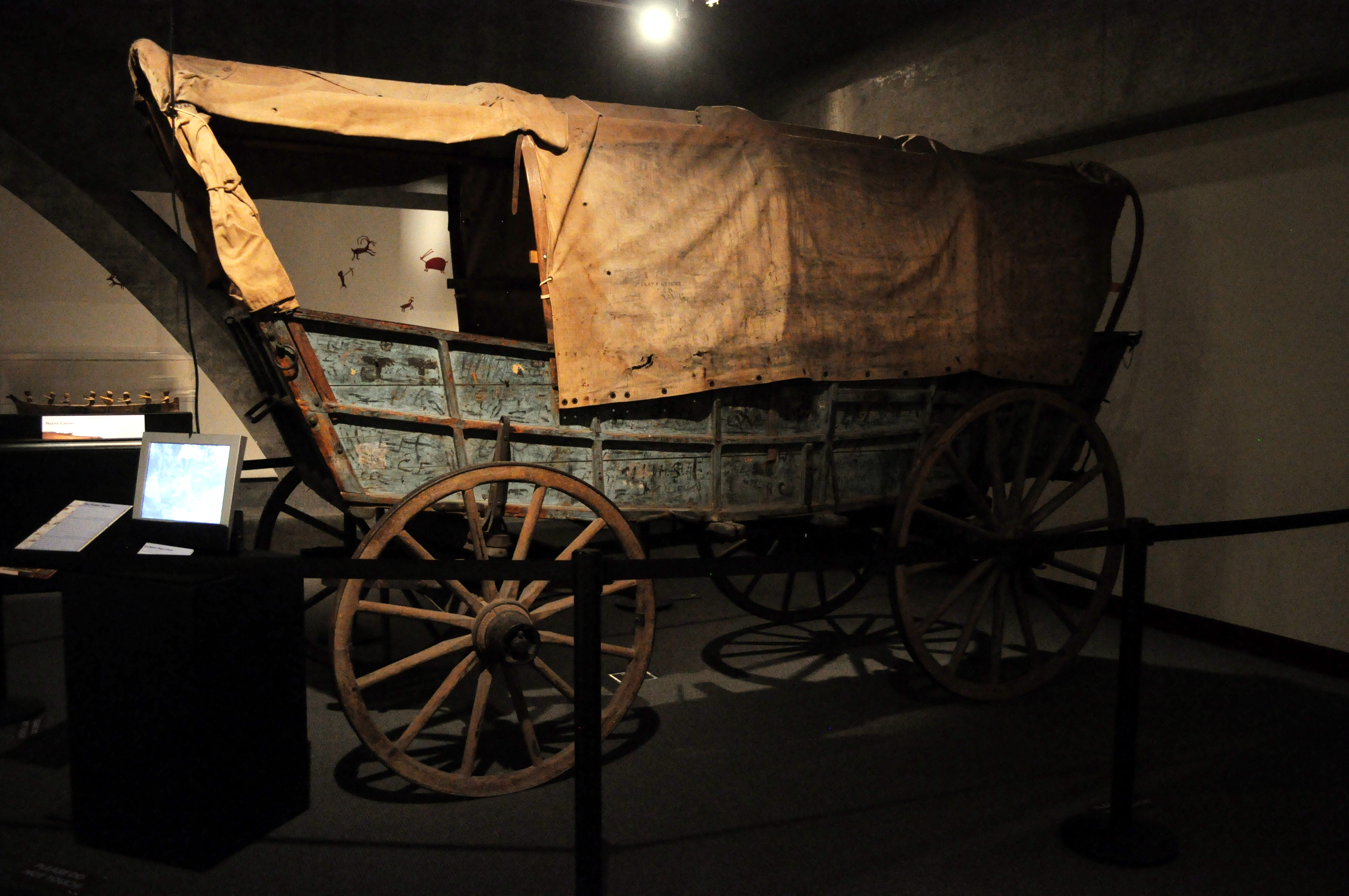
Ezra Meeker wagon, Washington State History Museum. Photographed during its temporary return to public view, in 2012.

Meeker did not have much money, so he raised it from friends. Ox-drawn wagons were not a common sight in the Puyallup of 1906; Meeker was unable to find an authentic complete wagon, and eventually used metal parts from the remains of three of them. The construction was done by Cline & McCoy of Puyallup. Meeker found a pair of oxen; even though one proved unsuitable, the owner insisted on him purchasing both. The one Meeker kept, named Twist, was lodged at the stockyards in Tacoma as he sought another. Meeker fixed on a herd of steers which had been brought in from Montana. He decided on one which was particularly heavy, which he named Dave. Although Dave gave Meeker much difficulty, beginning with the 8-mile (13 km) drive home to Puyallup after the purchase, the animal eventually helped pull the wagon over 8,000 miles (13,000 km).

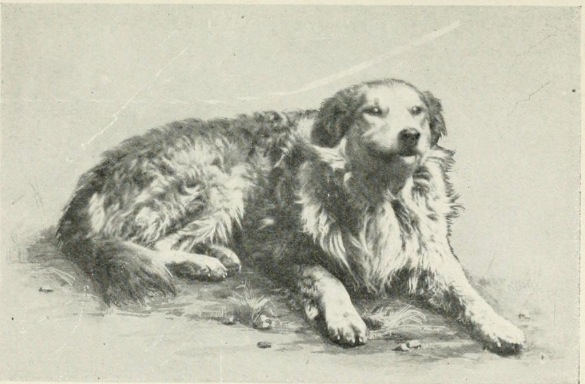
Meeker's dog Jim

Although Meeker had not had a dog in his wagon in 1852, he knew that people liked them, and sought to add one to his crew. Jim, a large, friendly collie who became an expedition member and Meeker's companion for the next six years, had belonged to one of Meeker's neighbors, a Mr. James. Meeker was impressed by the way Jim drove James' chickens out of the area where the family grew berries, by moving slowly. Five dollars to one of James' children secured the purchase. Some of Meeker's friends tried to talk him out of the trip; one local minister warned against this "impracticable project", stating that it was "cruel to let this aged man start on this journey only to perish by exposure in the mountains".

Meeker had taken an ox team and wagon to Portland's Lewis and Clark Centennial Exposition in 1905; en route he had kept his eyes open for places to set up suitable monuments on the Cowlitz Trail, on which pioneers had journeyed from the Columbia River to Puget Sound. He made arrangements with locals in towns along that trail to raise money to build monuments there. He gave lectures as a fundraiser, but raised little money. He took his team and wagon for daylong shakedown trips, despite the mocking of some who remembered him as Hop King. After several days camped on his lawn as practice for the trip, and then in other nearby locales, Meeker set out from Olympia on February 19, 1906.

=== Return to the Trail (1906–1908) ===
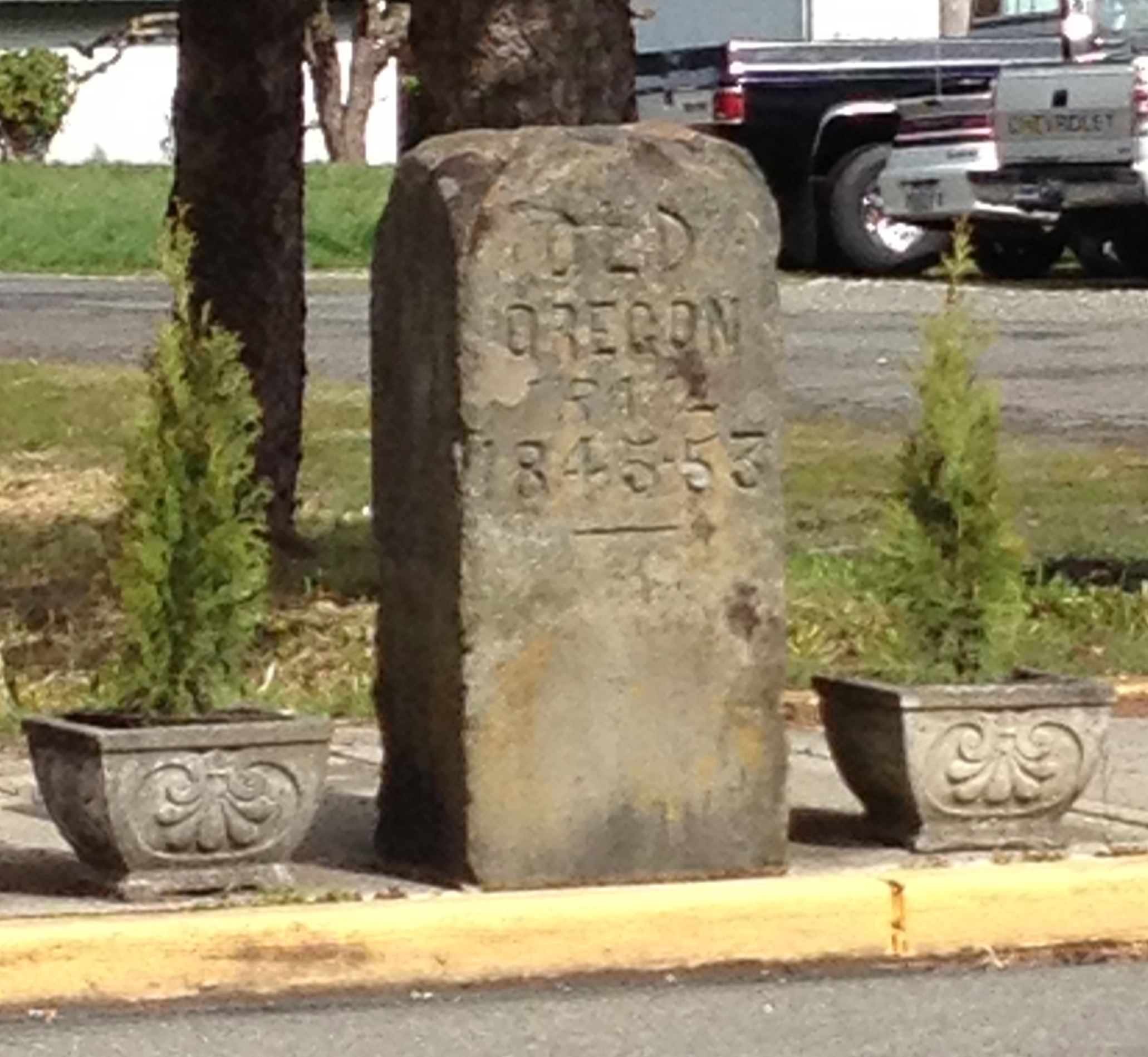
First monument erected by Ezra Meeker on his trek, Tenino, Washington (seen in 2013)

According to Larsen in his book on Meeker's journey east,

It's easy to assume Ezra Meeker's remarkable 1906–08 expedition over the Oregon Trail was a well-oiled machine that worked as planned ... But it wasn't always an easy journey. ... Faith in the whole enterprise, let alone encouragement, was in rather short supply. His own daughter told him that people would laugh at him if he went out on the trail with an old yoke of oxen ...

The first stop after Olympia for "The Old Oregon Trail Monument Expedition" was Tenino, Washington, where Meeker went ahead by train on February 20, 1906, to make arrangements for the first monument of the trip. He still had no driver, and had his wagon pulled to Tenino by horses, with the oxen trailing behind. He appealed to a local quarry for a suitable stone, which was carved and was dedicated in Tenino at a ceremony on the 21st. He had less success as he journeyed south towards Portland; at none of the remaining Washington stops was a monument erected, and although Meeker placed wooden posts where monuments should go, most of the designated towns did not follow through. The lack of enthusiasm about Meeker's mission continued in Portland, where the Unitarian church elders voted against allowing Meeker the use of the building to give a fundraising lecture, pledging to do nothing to "encourage that old man to go out on the Plains to die".

In Portland, Meeker lost his remaining helpers (one refused to take a pay cut, the others for personal reasons). One stayed on for the boat voyage up the Columbia before leaving at The Dalles, where Meeker hired a driver/cook, William Mardon, at $30 per month. He remained with Meeker for the next three years. Meeker also installed an odometer on his wagon, calling The Dalles "Mile Zero" of his expedition. In The Dalles, Meeker engaged in activities which would set the pattern for his progress along the Trail: He showed off himself, his wagon and animals, to the public, and sold tickets for a lecture (fifty cents for adults, half that for children) he would give about the Oregon Trail, including images shown with a stereopticon. He also met with members of civic committees to raise money for a local monument. Often these monuments were erected after Meeker passed: he would position a post to designate its location. According to reporter James Aldredge in his 1975 article on Meeker's trip, "for a septuagenarian he must have been blessed with remarkable health and endurance ... When the curious procession got underway, not the least impressive part of it was Meeker himself, with his face framed by his flowing white hair and his patriarchal beard." According to reporter Bart Ripp in his 1993 article on Meeker, "the first expedition east in 1906 was supposed to be a speaking tour, but people were more interested in seeing the old coot in a covered wagon. It was the 20th century, and Americans wanted a show."

As he journeyed east from The Dalles, Meeker met with more enthusiasm than in his home state as he slowly passed through Oregon and Idaho. As word began to spread, he sometimes found the townsfolk prepared for him, or with a stone ordered or even ready. The monument in Boise, dedicated by Meeker on April 30, 1906, stands on the grounds of the Idaho State Capitol. On the road, he camped as he had a half century before, but in towns most often took a hotel room, though who paid for this is uncertain. Near Pacific Springs, at South Pass in Wyoming, Meeker had a stone inscribed to mark where the Trail passes through the Continental Divide.

Meeker remembered in a memoir,

The sight of Sweetwater River, twenty miles [32 km] out from South Pass, revived many pleasant memories and some that were sad. (Note: His younger brother Clark had drowned in 1854 at Devil's Gate on the Sweetwater.) I could remember the sparkling, clear water, the green skirt of undergrowth along the banks, and the restful camps, as we trudged up the stream so many years ago. And now I saw the same channel, the same hills, and apparently the same waters swiftly passing. But where were the camp fires? Where was the herd of gaunt cattle? Where the sound of the din of bells? the hallooing for lost children? Or the little groups off on the hillside to bury the dead? All were gone.

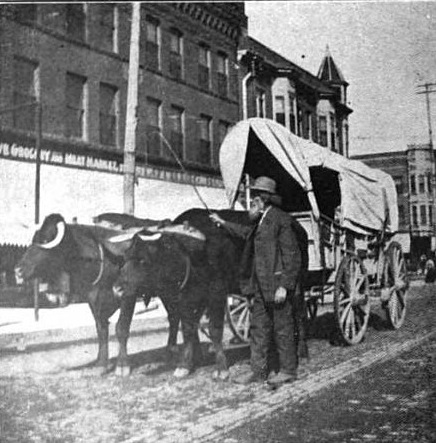
Meeker in Omaha

Nebraska proved resistant to Meeker's sales pitch, and near Brady, the ox Twist died, possibly after eating a poisonous plant. Meeker had to wire home to supporters for money. He hired teams of horses to pull the wagon on a temporary basis, and an attempt with two cows was not successful. He was able to temporarily yoke Dave with a cow which proved more suitable. At the Omaha Stockyards, Meeker found another ox, which he named Dandy, and broke him in on the way to Indianapolis, near where Meeker had once lived and 2,600 miles (4,200 km) by road from Puyallup. Beginning in Nebraska, Meeker began to sell postcards from photos taken on the way—there was then a craze for postcards in the United States. He also arranged for the printing of a book about his 1852 trip, much of which he wrote during noontime halts on his 1906 trip. The funds from the sales of these items allowed him to meet expenses on the road. Meeker's exploits were closely followed in newspapers on the West Coast as eastern and midwestern stories about him were reprinted there—when westerners perceived any slights towards Meeker, indignant editorials followed.

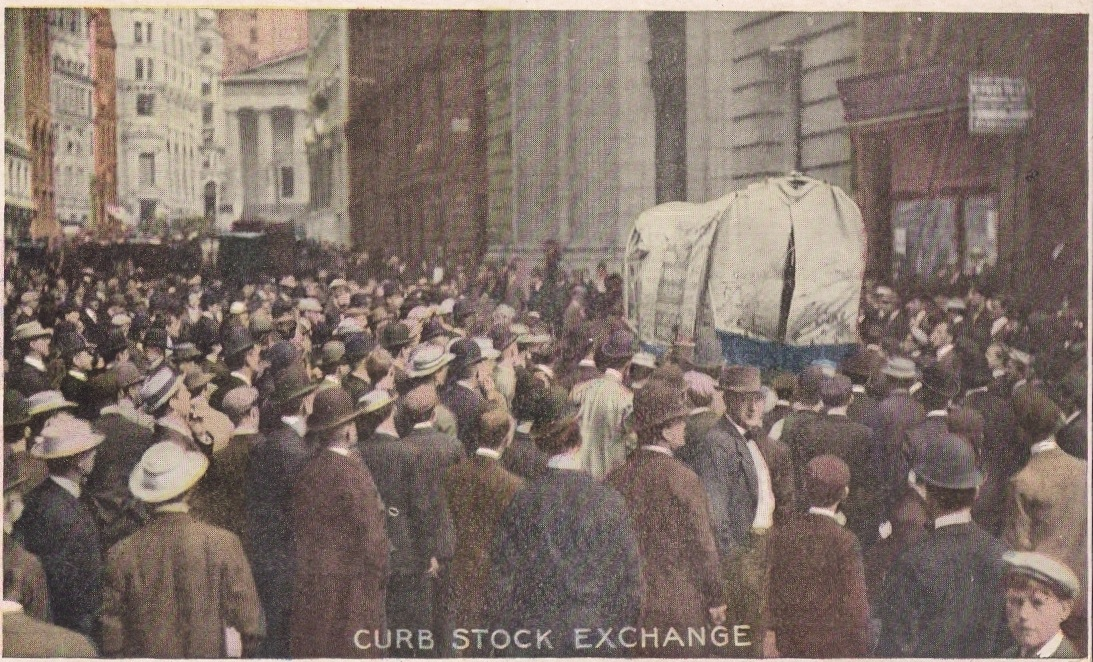
Meeker in Wall Street

After a visit to Eddyville, Iowa, from where he had set out in 1852, Meeker spent several weeks in Indianapolis, leaving on March 1, 1907, when his permit to sell on the streets there expired. With the Oregon Trail run completed, he proceeded east through Ohio, Pennsylvania, and New York State, seeking to both raise public awareness and earn some money for himself through sales of his merchandise. He often spent several days in a location, so long as sales of postcards and books flourished. When the expedition reached New York City, Mayor George B. McClellan Jr. was absent but the acting mayor told Meeker that, although he could not grant him a permit, he would instruct the police not to molest him. The message was apparently not well-communicated, as at 161st and Amsterdam Avenue a policeman arrested Meeker's helper, Mardon, for driving cattle upon the streets of New York in violation of a local ordinance. A stalemate followed as Meeker refused to move his oxen and the police had no means of doing so. The situation was resolved when higher authority ordered Mardon's release. Meeker wanted to drive the length of Broadway; it took a month to get the legal problems resolved. It took him six hours to drive the length of Manhattan. He had arranged with the press for photographers, who took shots of him at the New York Stock Exchange and the sub-Treasury building across Wall Street. Later in his stay, he drove across the Brooklyn Bridge.

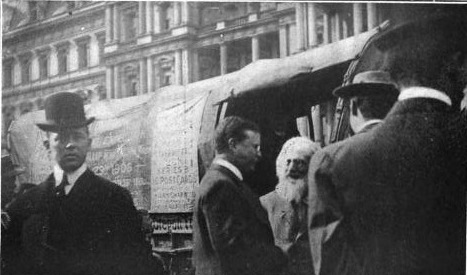
Meeker shows his wagon to President Theodore Roosevelt.

After a small family reunion at the old Meeker homestead near Elizabeth, New Jersey, Meeker headed south towards Washington, D.C. He had hoped to meet President Theodore Roosevelt at his summer home in Oyster Bay, New York, but Roosevelt's staff declined, offering a meeting in Washington instead. Members of the Washington State congressional delegation cleared the way, and Meeker met Roosevelt on November 29, 1907. The President went outside the White House to view Meeker's wagon and team, and expressed support for Meeker's activities, and for a Meeker proposal for a cross-country highway (there were then none) in honor of the pioneers. After Washington, the tour wound down: Meeker went home to Puyallup from Pittsburgh by train to see his ailing wife. On his return to the East, he arranged for transport by riverboat and train, with a journey across Missouri by wagon. The expedition was offloaded from the train in Portland, and Meeker proceeded north across Washington State (receiving a much warmer reception) on a slow route, finishing in Seattle on July 18, 1908.

=== Advocate for the Oregon Trail (1909–1925) ===
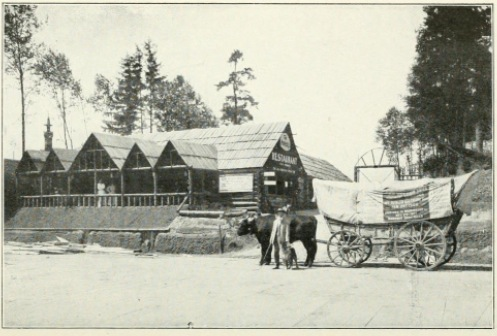
Meeker with his wagon, team, and restaurant at Seattle's 1909 Alaska-Yukon-Pacific Exposition

Meeker ran a large pioneer exhibit and restaurant at the 1909 Alaska-Yukon-Pacific Exposition in Seattle; he later ruefully stated the Exposition had cost him his earnings from the book and card sales during his wagon tour. Later that year, he spent time in California, journeying with his wagon and team. Eliza Jane Meeker died in 1909 in Seattle—she had been in poor health for some years. Ezra Meeker was in San Francisco, peddling his wares, when his wife died—it took three days to locate him, after which he journeyed north for the funeral before returning to his work. On New Year's Day 1910, Meeker and his wagon and team participated in the Tournament of Roses Parade in Pasadena.

In 1910, the Humphrey Bill, to appropriate money for monuments to mark the Trail, passed the House of Representatives and was introduced in the Senate, with a proviso that no money would be spent unless the Secretary of War could certify that the work would not require any further appropriations. Ezra Meeker set out that year on another two-year-long expedition, with the emphasis this time on locating and marking where the Trail had been, rather than on building monuments. Sometimes the ruts in the ground from the emigrants' wagons still existed and made it obvious, but other times he had to rely on the memories of old settlers. He journeyed to Texas, but had no success in interesting people in his project there. His tour was ended in 1912 in Denver when a flood struck the city, resulting in damage to his books. Nevertheless, according to Green, Meeker's two trips resulted in the placement of 150 monuments. A version of the Humphrey Bill passed the Senate in 1913, but died when the House of Representatives took no action. Despite this failure, groups began marking western trails: the Sons and Daughters of the American Revolution put up plaques along the Cowlitz Trail in 1916.

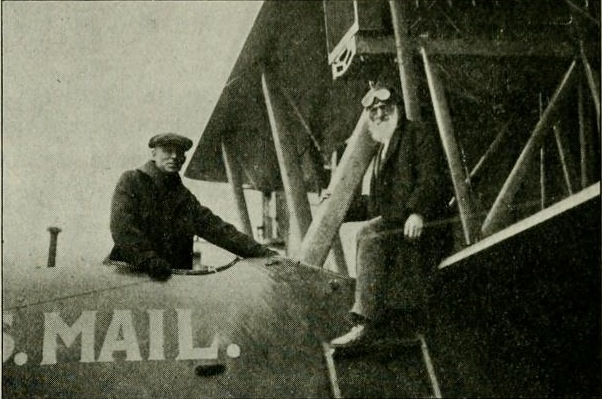
The ox-team pioneer tries an airplane, 1921.

Beginning in 1913, Meeker began to plan his role in the 1915 Panama-Pacific Exposition in San Francisco. He had donated his wagon and oxen to a park in Tacoma: when officials there expressed concern about the cost of building a proper pavilion for them, Meeker reclaimed them and set off with them to California. Deeming Dandy unfit for the road, Meeker had him slaughtered in Portland in June 1914 and had the hide shipped back to Tacoma for taxidermy; in November, the same fate met Dave in California. Meeker's wagon was exhibited at the Exposition in San Francisco. His tales of the Oregon Trail became one of the star attractions of the Exposition. Nevertheless, he quarreled with the administrators of the Washington State Building, feeling that it should be open on Sundays, when the largest crowds came to the grounds. On his return, the oxen and wagon were mounted as an exhibit at the Washington State History Museum until it closed for a move to new premises in 1995. The wagon was then deemed too fragile for display.

In 1916, the 85-year-old Meeker made another trip, this time by Pathfinder automobile. The Pathfinder Company, of Indianapolis, lent Meeker a car with a covered-wagon-style top and a driver as a publicity stunt. Meeker also received a small stipend, and journeyed in the vehicle from Washington, D.C. to Olympia. Meeker saw the use of a motor vehicle as publicizing the need for a transcontinental highway. During this trip, he lectured on the need for a national highway; before he left he met with President Woodrow Wilson and discussed the topic with him.

Bernard Sun, whose grandparents were Oregon Trail pioneers in Wyoming, remembered another side of Meeker:

He'd camp down on Rush Creek with a covered wagon. The old bum was riding a grub line. He'd grub meals from all the ranchers around here. My grandmother hated the sight of him. He'd comb that long hair at the dinner table. Put his [false] teeth in to eat and take them out to talk.

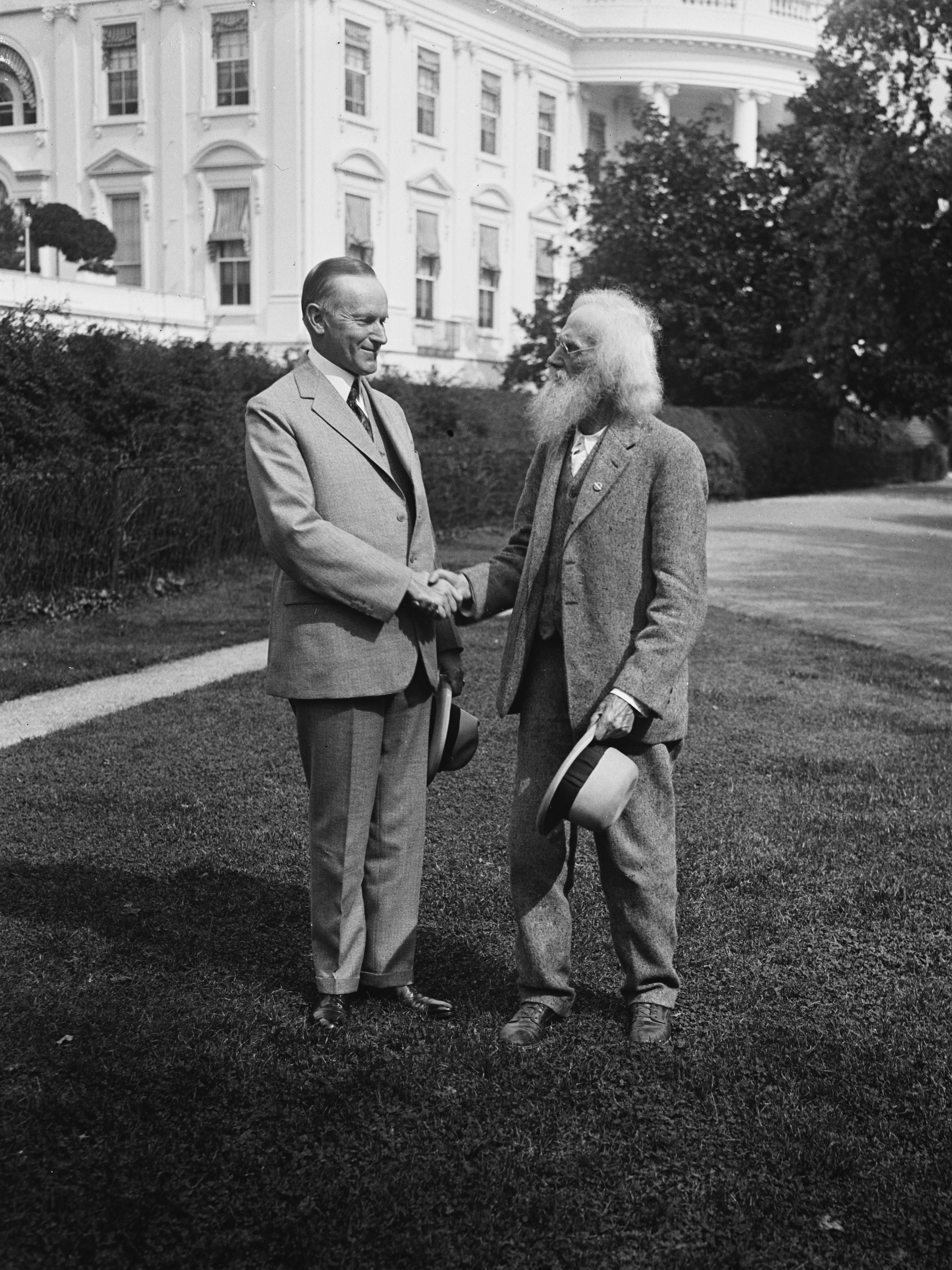
Meeker with President Calvin Coolidge, 1924

Although World War I distracted public attention from Meeker and his activities, he used the time to plan for the future. On December 29, 1919, his 89th birthday, he began work on another book, Seventy Years of Progress in Washington, which was published to favorable reviews. In association with Dr. Howard R. Driggs, a professor of English education at the University of Utah and later at New York University, he published a revised version of his memoirs, Ox-Team Days on the Oregon Trail. In 1922, he fell ill for one of the few times in his life. Newspapers reported that he refused to stay in bed, and his grandson, a physician, stated that he was going to put Meeker back to bed and "I am going to keep him there—if I can. If I can."

Recovered, the nonagenarian Meeker began making fresh travel plans. With the International Air Races to be held at Dayton, Ohio, in 1924, Meeker tried to get the War Department to allow him to fly there. He was successful, and flew with the Army pilot, Oakley G. Kelly. At a stop in Boise, Meeker quipped they were making better time than with his ox team, and in Dayton met aviation pioneer Orville Wright, to whom he commented, "You'd be surprised at the difference between riding in a Prairie Schooner and in an airplane." The publicity was so favorable that the Army had Kelly fly Meeker the rest of the way to Washington, D.C., where the onetime pioneer met President Calvin Coolidge in October 1924. Meeker returned to Seattle by train. Wanting the government to build a road over Naches Pass, where he had guided his father's party seventy years before, Meeker ran for the Washington House of Representatives in 1924 from the 47th district but was defeated in the Republican primary by 35 votes. In 1925, Meeker drove an ox team for several months while touring in J.C. Miller's Wild West Show.

=== Meeker reaches the end of the trail (1925–1928) ===
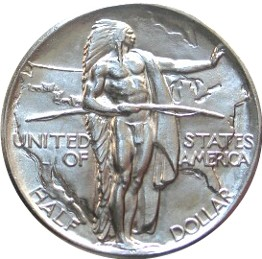
One side of the Oregon Trail Memorial half dollar

By 1925, Congress had still not passed an appropriation to mark the Trail. One means of federally sponsored fundraising at that time was to get Congress to authorize a commemorative coin (usually a half dollar) and designate a sponsoring organization to buy the issue at face value from the government and sell it to the public at a premium. Meeker got the idea from a group of Idahoans seeking a coin to further their preservation work at Fort Hall; he arranged a merger of efforts. Beginning in 1925, Meeker pressed for such a half dollar to honor the pioneers and provide money for his efforts, and in April 1926 he appeared before a Senate committee, urging the passage of legislation. Congress obliged, and Coolidge signed the bill on May 17, 1926, at a ceremony which Meeker attended.

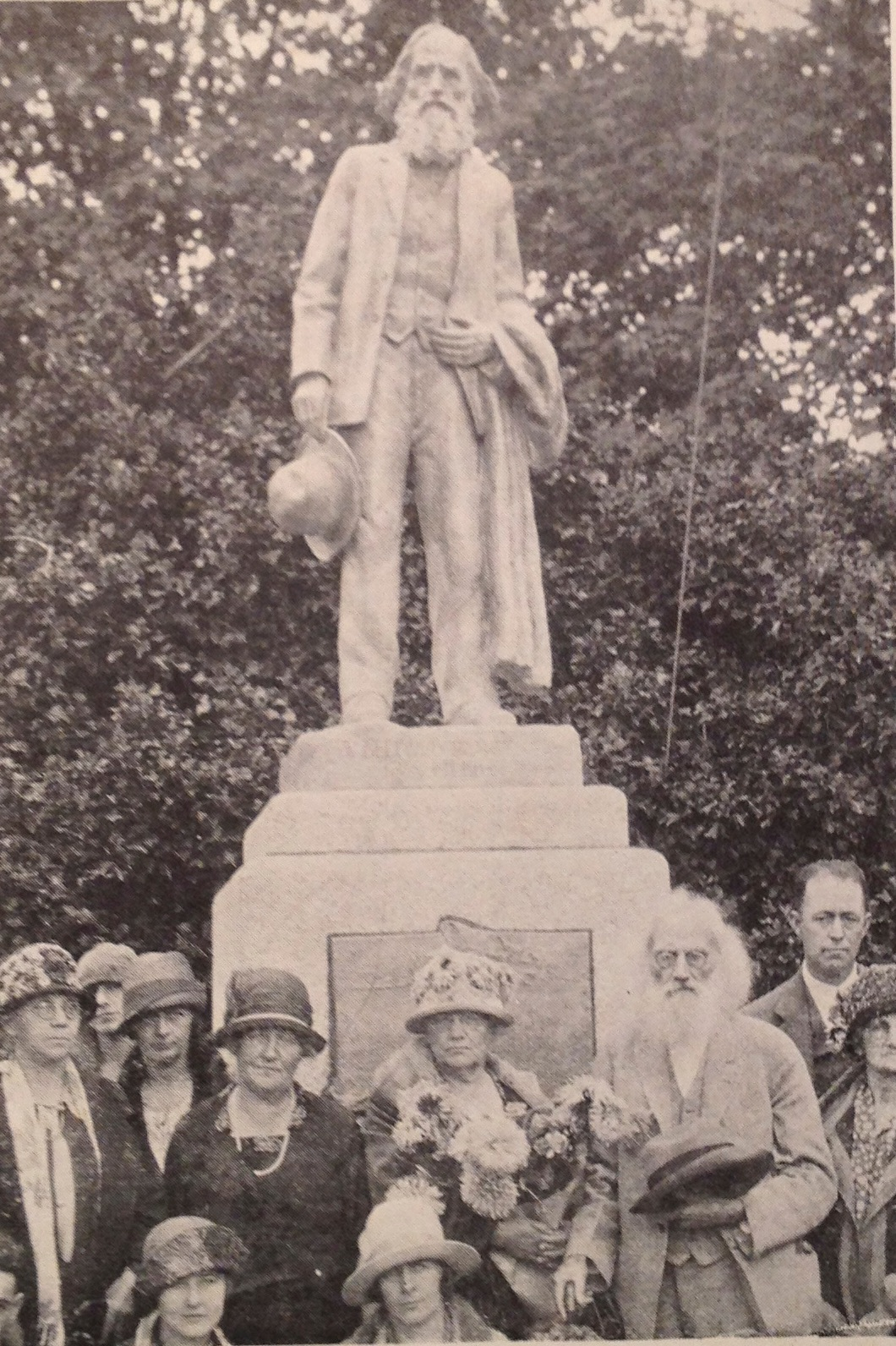
Meeker (lower right) at the dedication of the statue to himself, September 14, 1926

Meeker had founded the Old Oregon Trail Association in 1922. In early 1926, it was incorporated in New York as the Oregon Trail Memorial Association (OTMA), and was given office space there by the National Highways Association. The legislation authorizing the new coin designated the OTMA as the organization which could purchase Oregon Trail Memorial half dollars from the government. The piece was designed by Laura Gardin Fraser and her husband, James Earle Fraser (who had designed the Buffalo nickel). Six million coins were authorized, and a beginning was made by the striking of 48,000 for the Association at the Philadelphia Mint; when those ran low, 100,000 more were coined at the San Francisco Mint. Meeker was less successful with the later issue, and many remained unsold. Although the Bureau of the Mint struck more in 1928, these remained impounded until after Meeker's death, with tens of thousands of the earlier issues unsold.

Seattle had been Meeker's home since moving out of the mansion, but in the mid-1920s the citizens of Puyallup sought to honor him by the erection of a statue in Pioneer Park, the site of Meeker's one-time homestead. They also sought to preserve the home site, over which Eliza Jane Meeker had planted ivy a half-century before, building a pergola to support the plant. With the statue and pergola completed, Meeker returned to Puyallup for the dedication ceremony in 1926. The same year, at age 95, Meeker published his first and only novel, Kate Mulhall, a Romance of the Oregon Trail.

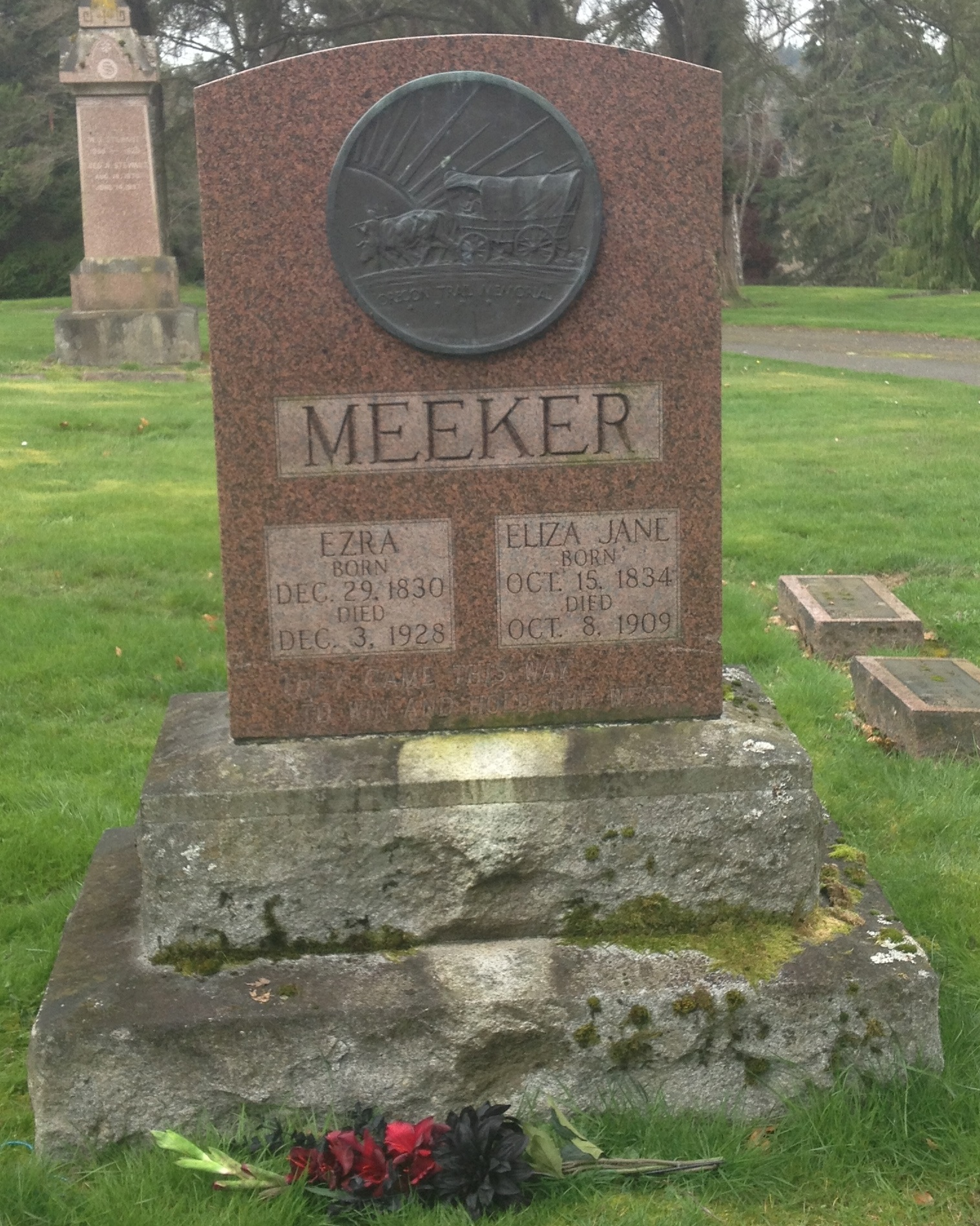
Ezra Meeker's grave, Puyallup, Washington

Meeker was again advocating better roads, and gained the support of Henry Ford, who built him a Model A car with a covered wagon-style top, dubbed the Oxmobile, to be used in another expedition over the Trail to publicize Meeker's highway proposals. In October 1928, Meeker was hospitalized with pneumonia in Detroit. He returned to Seattle, where he fell ill again. Meeker was taken to a room in the Frye Hotel, where he told his daughter Ella Meeker Templeton, "I can't go. I have not yet finished my work." Ezra Meeker died there on December 3, 1928, just under a month short of his 98th birthday. His body was taken in procession back to Puyallup, where he was interred beside his wife Eliza Jane in Woodbine Cemetery. Under a plaque based on the Oregon Trail Memorial coin Ezra Meeker had inspired, their gravestone, erected by the OTMA in 1939, reads, "They came this way to win and hold the West."

== Legacy ==
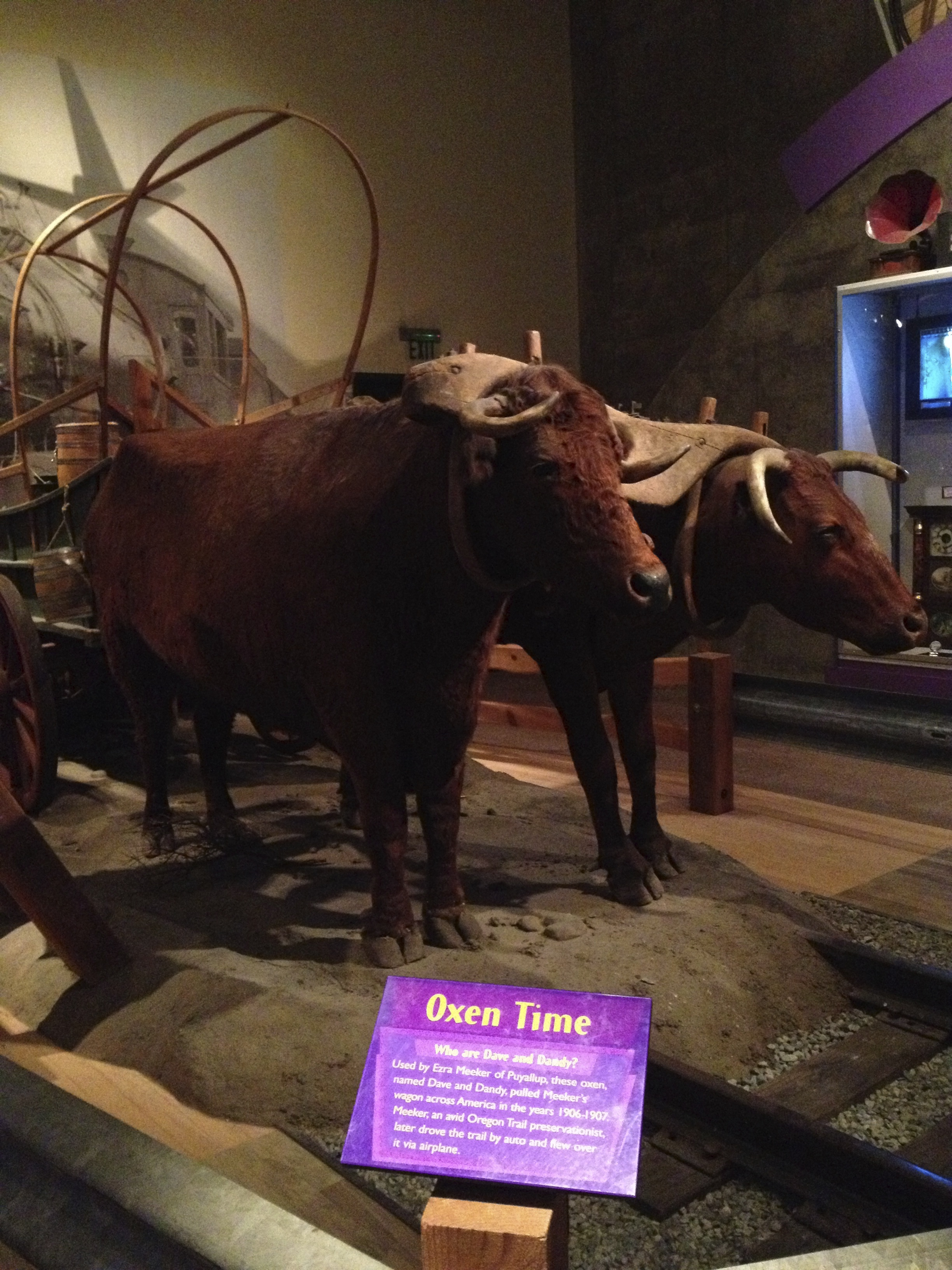
Dave and Dandy, on exhibit in 2013 at the Washington State Historical Society Museum in Tacoma

Driggs succeeded Meeker as president of the OTMA, and remained in that capacity at the association and its successor, the American Pioneer Trails Association (APTA), until his own death at age 89 in 1963. The year 1930, marking 100 years since both Meeker's birth and the first wagon train leaving St. Louis for the Oregon Country, was proclaimed the Covered Wagon Centennial. The largest event was at one of the landmarks along the Oregon Trail, Wyoming's Independence Rock, on July 3–5, 1930. This event included the dedication of a plaque depicting Meeker, embedded in the rock. For many years, the OTMA made it a practice to go out each summer and dedicate monuments along the Oregon Trail. Although the APTA no longer exists, that mission has been continued by state historical societies and organizations which share its purpose, such as the Oregon-California Trails Association.

The commemorative half dollars were struck in small numbers in most years of the 1930s; after collectors complained about the lengthy series and high prices, Congress forbade further strikings in 1939. The first route across America, the Lincoln Highway, was completed in the 1920s, and others soon followed. Although Meeker's highway along the Trail was not built, U.S. Route 30 generally parallels the route of the Oregon Trail. A number of sites relating to Meeker remain in Puyallup. In addition to his gravesite, and the Meeker Mansion (now owned by and being restored by the Ezra Meeker Historical Society) there is Pioneer Park, where the ivy-covered pergola and the statue of Meeker may be found.

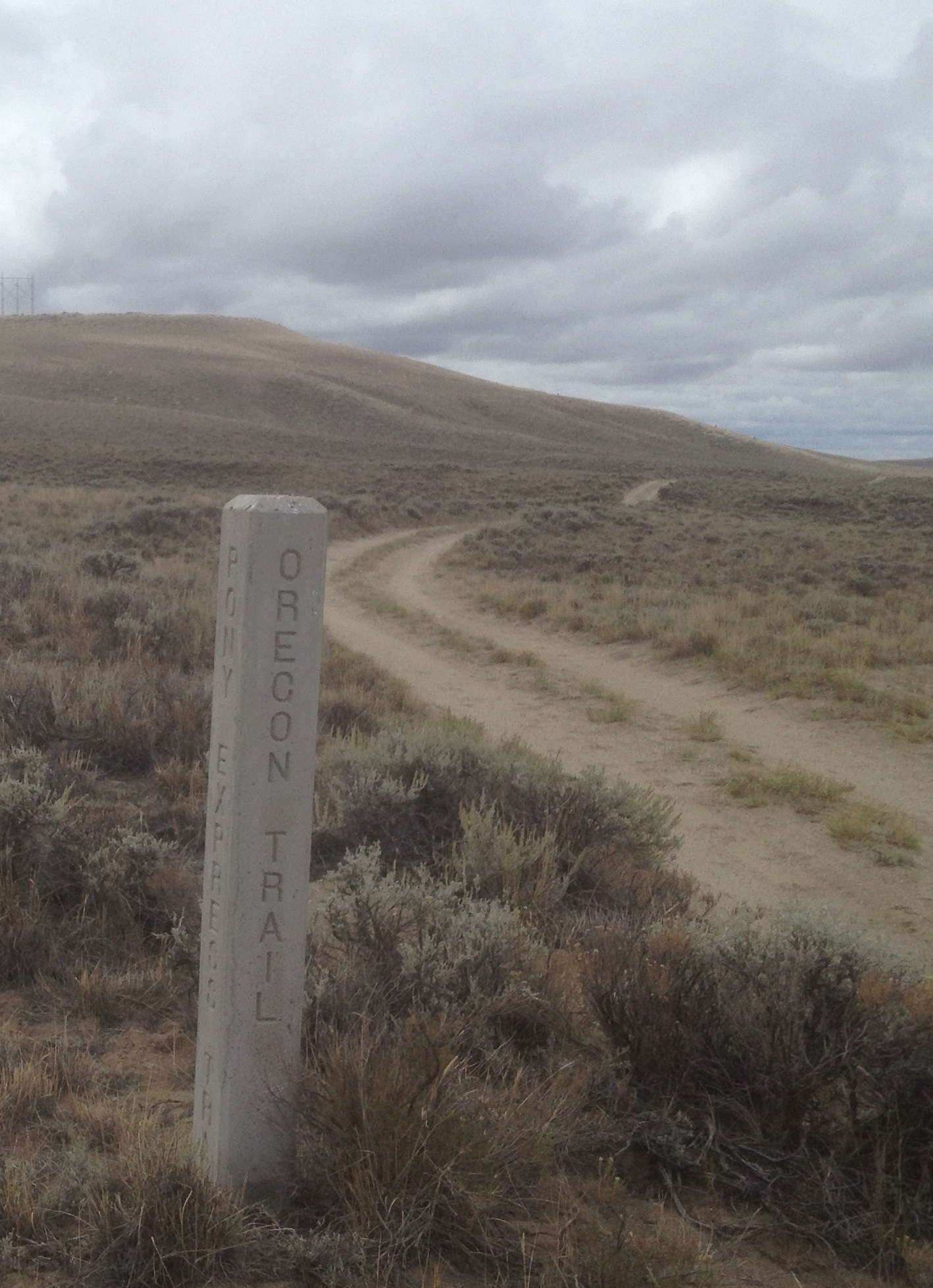
The Oregon Trail

Local historian Lori Price noted, "Throughout his long life of nearly 98 years, the word for Meeker was action." Historian David Dary, in his book on the Oregon Trail, deems Meeker primarily responsible for re-awakening public interest in it. According to Bert Webber, "There would be no 'Oregon Trail' to enjoy today if Ezra Meeker had not set out, by himself, and without government subsidy, to preserve it." Driggs stated of Meeker after his death:

So the Oregon Trail was blazed and tramped—traders, trappers, gold-seekers, missionaries, colonists—until the highway stretched from the Missouri River to the Pacific Ocean. Years passed and railroads supplanted the old Oregon Trail; its very location was forgotten; disputes arose. Then an old man, almost eighty, clambered into a prairie schooner, made in part of some in which the pioneers had journeyed westward, and the Oregon Trail was retraced and marked with monuments, that a people and a nation may not forget.

== Books by Ezra Meeker ==
- Washington Territory West of the Cascade Mountains. Olympia, Washington Territory: Printed at the Transcript Office. 1870. ISBN 9780665156052. OCLC 718439467.
- Hop Culture in the United States. W.A. Lawrence. Puyallup, Washington Territory: E. Meeker & Co. 1880. OCLC 499484270.
- Pioneer Reminiscences of Puget Sound, the Tragedy of Leschi. Seattle, WA: Lowman & Hanford Stationery and Print. Co. 1905. OCLC 667877082.
- Ox Team; or, The Old Oregon Trail, 1852–1906. New York, NY: Ezra Meeker. 1907. OCLC 285181271, 669330590.
- Ventures and Adventures of Ezra Meeker. Seattle, WA: Rainier Print. Co. 1908. OCLC 679498491.
- Personal Experiences on the Oregon Trail Sixty Years Ago. Saint Louis, MO: McAdoo Printing Co. 1912.
- Uncle Ezra's Pioneer Short Stories for Children. Tacoma, WA: D. W. Cooper. c. 1915. hdl:1957/12386. OCLC 4935396, 680290582.
- The Busy Life of Eighty-Five Years of Ezra Meeker. Seattle, WA: Ezra Meeker. 1916. OCLC 679500468.
- Seventy Years of Progress in Washington. Seattle, WA / Tacoma, WA: Allstrum Printing Co. 1921. OCLC 644000145, 300598059.
- Driggs, Howard R., ed. (1922). Ox-Team Days on the Oregon Trail. Pioneer life series. F.N. Wilson (illustrator). Yonkers-on-Hudson, NY: World Book Co. OCLC 53229256, 746979402, 681269138.
- Meeker, Ezra (1926). Kate Mulhall, a Romance of the Oregon Trail. Landers Sanford, M.; Kausch, Rudolf A.; Lyons, Oscar W. (illustrators). New York, NY: Ezra Meeker. OCLC 701648479.

== See also ==
- Wyoming historical monuments and markers

== Notes and references ==
Explanatory notes

Citations

== Bibliography ==
- Dary, David (2004). The Oregon Trail: An American Saga. New York City: Alfred A. Knopf. ISBN 978-0-375-41399-5.
- Driggs, Howard R; Meeker, Ezra; Oregon Trail Memorial Association (1932). Covered-wagon centennial and Ox-teams days. Yonkers-on-Hudson, NY: World Book Company. OCLC 898317529.
- Ezra Meeker Historical Society (1972). Ezra Meeker : compiled from his own writings, magazine and newspaper accounts of his many activities, and the writings of his contemporaries. Puyallup, WA: Ezra Meeker Historical Society. OCLC 10875105.
- Green, Frank S. (1969). Ezra Meeker—Pioneer: A Guide to the Ezra Meeker Papers in the Library of the Washington State Historical Society. Tacoma, WA: Washington State Historical Society. ISBN 978-0-375-41399-5.
- Larsen, Dennis M. (2006). The Missing Chapters: The Untold Story of Ezra Meeker's Old Oregon Trail Monument Expedition January 1906 to July 1908. Puyallup, WA: Ezra Meeker Historical Society. ISBN 978-0-9674164-2-7.
- Larsen, Dennis M. (2009). Slick as a Mitten: Ezra Meeker's Klondike Enterprise. Pullman, WA: Washington State University Press. ISBN 978-0-87422-302-6.
- Meeker, Ezra (1922). Ox-Team Days on the Oregon Trail (revised ed.). Yonkers, NY: The World Book Company. OCLC 654210822.
- Price, Lori; Anderson, Ruth (2002). Puyallup: A Pioneer Paradise. The Making of America. Charleston, SC: Arcadia Publishing. ISBN 978-0-7385-2374-3.
- Webber, Bert (1986). The Oregon Trail Memorial Half-Dollar. Medford, OR: Webb Research Group. ISBN 0-936738-16-2.
- Webber, Bert; Webber, Margie (1992). Ezra Meeker; Champion of the Oregon Trail. Medford, OR: Webb Research Group. ISBN 0-936738-19-7.
