= H. Wayne Driggs =

H. Wayne Driggs (1902–1951) was the son of Howard R. Driggs and his wife Eva F. Driggs.

Driggs studied at the University of Utah and New York University. He wrote the script used in the 1937 Hill Cumorah Pageant, which was the first year the pageant was produced. He was a professor at NYU at that time. Driggs' script, with only a few changes, would remain the script used in the Hill Cumorah Pageant until 1987.

In 1945 Driggs became the president of the institution that would later be called Southern Utah University. He was still in this position at the time of his death in 1951.

In 1934 Driggs married Susan Elizabeth Swensen. They had five children.
