= Howard R. Driggs =

American novelist (1873–1963)

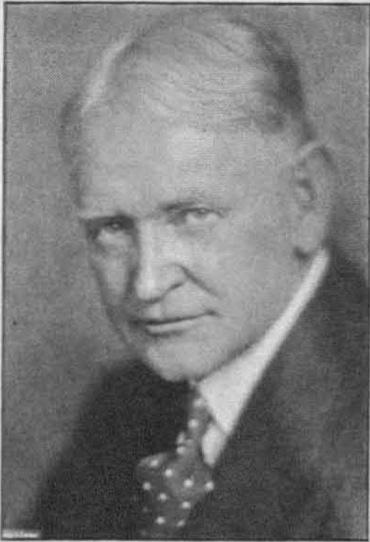

Personal details
- Born: Howard Roscoe Driggs; August 8, 1873; Pleasant Grove, Utah
- Died: February 17, 1963 (aged 89); Bayside, New York
- Resting place: Pleasant Grove City Cemetery; 40°22′9.12″N 111°44′21.84″W
- Spouse(s): Eva Frampton; Margaret Brazier Quarrier
- Children: by Frampton; H. Wayne Driggs; H. Perry Driggs
- Parents: Benjamin W. Driggs; Rosalia E. Cox

Howard Roscoe Driggs (August 8, 1873 – February 17, 1963) was an English professor at the University of Utah and New York University. He also was the author or editor of more than 50 books, including at least seven novels.

Driggs was born in Pleasant Grove, Utah. His parents had come to Utah with the Mormon pioneers. Driggs studied at Brigham Young Academy, the University of Utah, where he received bachelor's and master's degrees, the University of Chicago, and New York University where he received his Ph.D. in 1926.

Driggs first began teaching in a small school in Pleasant Grove just after graduating from Brigham Young Academy. He later was on the faculty of what is now Southern Utah University when it opened in 1897. From 1907 to 1923, he was a member of the University of Utah faculty, serving for part of that time as the principal of the university's teacher training school. From 1927 until his retirement in 1942 Driggs was an English professor at New York University. He made his home, for many decades, in Bayside, New York.

In 1897, Driggs married Eva Frampton in the Salt Lake Temple. They had two sons, H. Wayne Driggs (1902–1951) and H. Perry Driggs. Wayne studied at the University of Utah and New York University as his father had. He was serving as president of what is now Southern Utah University at the time of his death. Perry was an artist and advertising executive, he illustrated at least one of his father's books.

Driggs was a member of the Church of Jesus Christ of Latter-day Saints (LDS Church). He was heavily involved with the church's Sunday School, serving as a member of the organization's general board from 1910 to 1930. He was also involved in starting the first LDS Church Sunday Schools in New York City and Washington, D.C. Also in New York City, Driggs served for a time as the branch president. When the New York Stake was organized in 1934, Driggs was made a member of the stake high council.

From 1908 to 1911 Driggs was the president of the Utah Library and Gymnasium Association. In this capacity he supported the building of joint Library-gymnasiums with the goal of getting those who came for recreation to also read books. In 1919 he served as vice president of the National Education Association. In 1928 he was the president of the Oregon Trail Memorial Association.

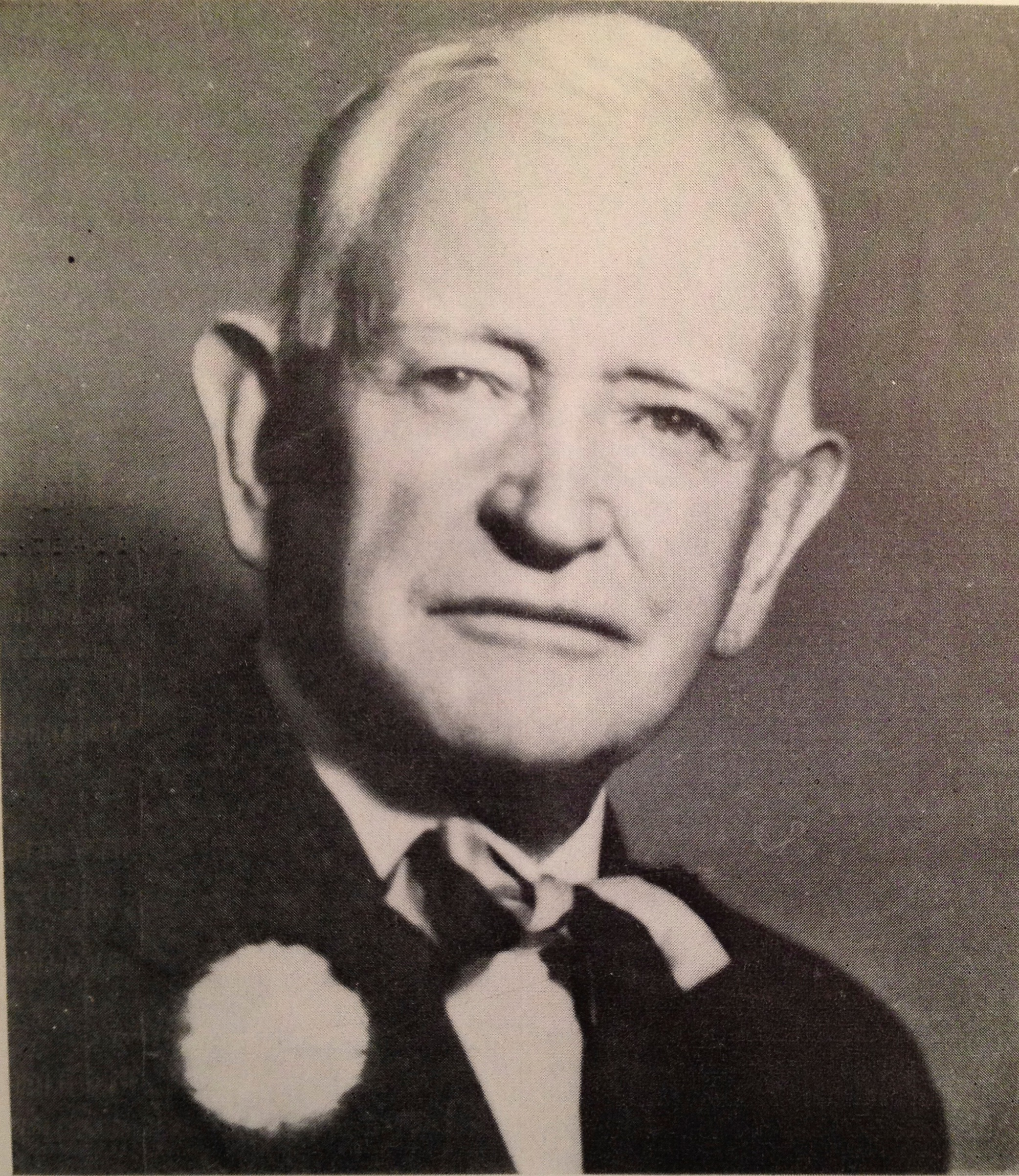
Driggs in his final years

In 1948, Driggs married Margaret Brazier Quarrier, who had three children from a previous marriage. She died in 2008.

Driggs first novel Wild Roses: A Tale of the Rockies was published in 1916. Among the novels Driggs wrote were Ben the Wagon Boy (1944) based on the story of his father, Benjamin Driggs. He also wrote George, the Handcart Pioneer (1952). He wrote a history of Pleasant Grove, Utah and also co-edited with Ezra Meeker Ox-Team days on the Oregon Trail. He also wrote many English text books.

He is honored by later historians for his work in collecting the memories of the Oregon Trail and the Pony Express, while there were still surviving people to give first-hand accounts. His book The Old West Speaks came out in October 1956, just as television popularized Westerns for a whole new generation. He spent many years collecting information about and promoting preservation of the pioneer trails in the west, and worked closely with artist and photographer William Henry Jackson (1843–1942).

Howard R. Driggs Elementary School, in Holladay, Utah, is named in honor of him, and an annual lecture series at Southern Utah University bears his name.
