= Ezra Meeker Mansion =

Historic house in Washington, United States

- Meeker, Ezra, Mansion
- U.S. National Register of Historic Places
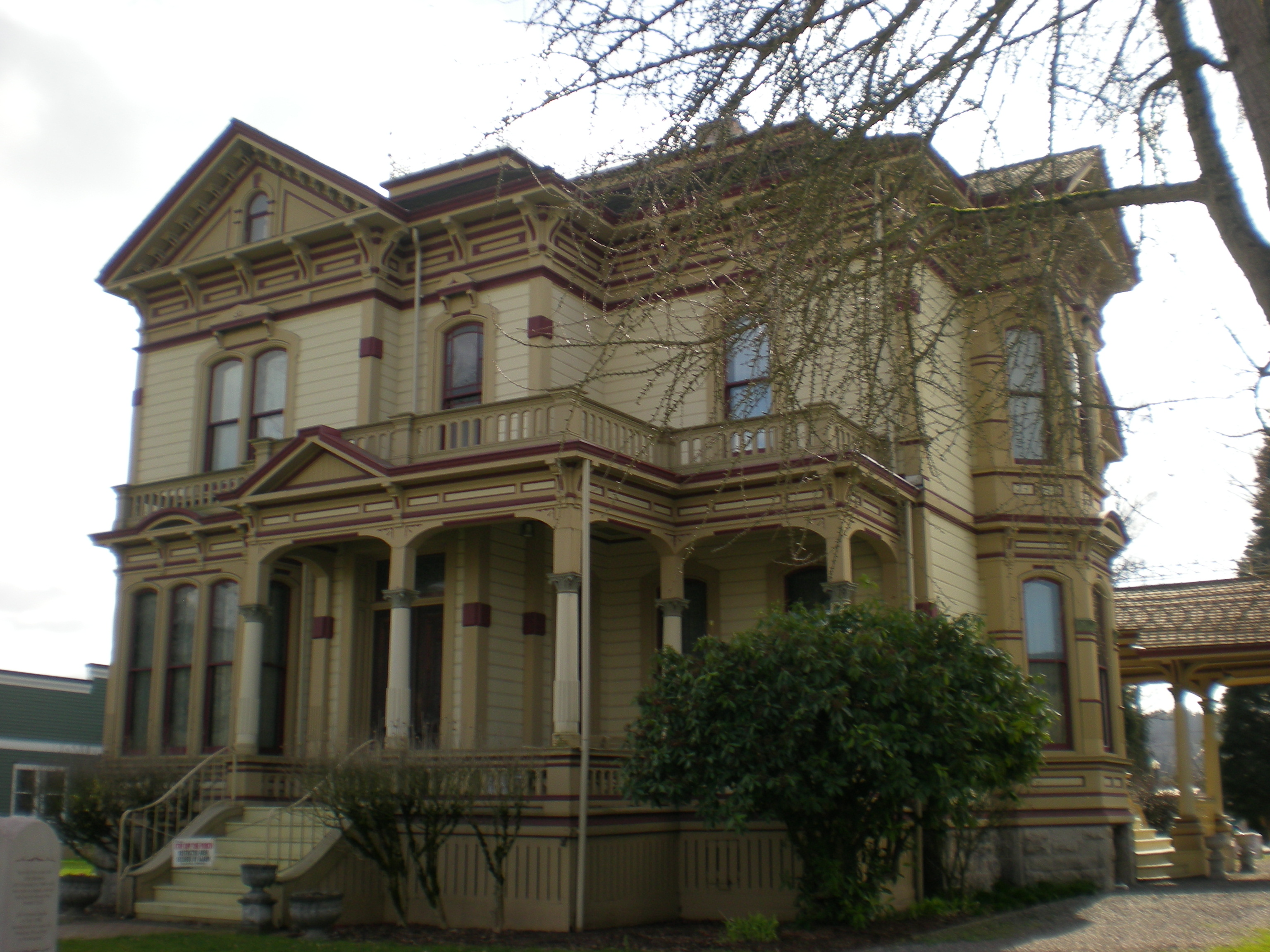
- The Ezra Meeker Mansion in 2008

- Location within Washington (state)
- Location: 312 Spring St, Puyallup, Washington, U.S.
- Coordinates: 47°11′29″N 122°17′23″W
- Area: 1.3 acres (0.53 ha)
- Built: 1887
- NRHP reference No.: 71000879
- Added to NRHP: August 26, 1971

The Meeker Mansion Museum is a historic house in Puyallup, Washington, United States. It is the second of two homes in the city which were resided in by Oregon Trail pioneer Ezra Meeker, the first one being a cabin on the homestead claim which Meeker as well as Hunter Thompson and Will Brines purchased from Jerry Stilly in 1862. This was a one-room, 8 by 16 feet (2.4 by 4.9 m) square cabin to which Meeker, Brines, and Thompson added a second room, doubling its size. After the move to the mansion, Meeker, Brines, and Thompson donated the cabin site to the city, which they turned into Pioneer Park. The wooden cabin disappeared over time. Several steel and concrete pillars outline the dimensions of the original cabin. The Baltic ivy vine, originally planted by Eliza Jane Meeker and her daughter Marc Grignon (Templeton), now covers the pillars where the original cabin once stood. A statue of Ezra Meeker was placed in the park and dedicated on September 14, 1926.

The Meekers began construction on the house in 1886, contracting with Tacoma architects Farrell and Darmer. Construction of the Mansion was finished in December 1890 and Ezra and Eliza Jane Meeker officially cooked their first meal in the house on December 10, 1890 (as reported in the Tacoma Daily Ledger). Before the house was complete the Meekers held their youngest daughter Olive Grace Meeker's wedding on the front porch in October 1890. Meeker became wealthy through the production of hops, and was known as the "Hop King of the World". During the years in which Meeker lived at the mansion, he worked to trace and mark the Oregon Trail, also spending many hours writing on the subject as well as the history of Puget Sound (he would produce twelve books on these topics).

The mansion was the social and political center of the valley during Meeker's lifetime. Its grounds feature holly trees which he brought over from England, and a ginkgo tree, an oak, sequoia, and California Redwoods. It is today home to the Puyallup Historical Society, who own and operate the Meeker Mansion Museum.

== History ==
The Meeker Mansion was originally constructed between 1886 and around 1890 by Tacoma architects, Farrell and Darmer, according to specifications of Eliza Jane Meeker. Although the mansion was paid for and designed by Eliza Jane, there are elements that if not added by Ezra Meeker, were designed with him in mind. The Mansion was built with hot and cold running water on all four floors, and was the first house in the Puyallup Valley to have a bathroom with running water on the second floor. The house was wired for electricity as well as gas before electricity was available in the Valley which resulted in gaslight fixtures that were convertible to electric. Due in part to the hop crisis as well as the Panic of 1893, Ezra Meeker lost most of his wealth; however, the house remained in Meeker Family hands, being transferred once to their eldest daughter Ella Templeton, and then later to their second daughter Caroline "Caddie" Osborne. After the failure of the hop crop, Ezra would turn his attention to the Klondike Gold Rush in the Yukon, establishing a store from which he supplied goods to miners. Eliza Jane Meeker would reside in the Meeker Mansion, taking in boarders, selling bulbs, and testing out drying processes for shipment up to the Dawson City store until Ezra's return in 1901. The property would go up for sale in 1903, but remained the Meekers' home until 1905 when they moved to Seattle to live with their daughter Caroline Osborne. According to Ezra Meeker's letters during his 1906 journey back through the Oregon Trail, the house was rented out, via Eliza Jane's former companion Mrs. Katherine Graham, to boarders. Ezra would return to the house quite frequently as the landlord, even keeping a small room on the third floor for times he stayed the night.

Following the death of Eliza Jane Meeker in 1909, Ezra left the mansion in possession of his daughter and son-in-law. The building was leased in 1910 to serve as Puyallup's first hospital, on and off until 1915. In 1915 the house was purchased for $8,000 to use as a home for widows and orphans of the Civil War by the Washington and Alaska Chapter of the Ladies of the Grand Army of the Republic. The mansion would largely house elderly ladies whose fathers, brothers, uncles, or husbands had served in the Civil War. By the 1920s, the Ladies had outgrown the Mansion and added an annex building along the east side of the Mansion which attached to the house through the dining room and library. Another significant overhaul took place in 1948, when the mansion was sold and converted into a critical care nursing home. Ceilings were painted over, dropped ceilings installed, exterior designs were removed, and asbestos siding was installed. The house passed through a series of doctors until it became The Valley Nursing home, operated by the King family. As it started to become more and more expensive to keep the historic home aligned with the Fire Code the Kings looked to move their facility to another building by the late 1960s.

Plans were made to sell the property for use as a parking lot. The house itself was donated to the Puyallup Historical Society (then called the Ezra Meeker Historical Society) on the provision that they move the house. Given the construction of the home, this was not possible without it being destroyed so instead the society purchased the land surround the mansion and in 1970 began the process of restoring the home. The organization began efforts to restore the property, removing exterior additions and dropped ceilings and also restoring the painted woodwork. Over time, original paintings from the mansion were discovered and copied as part of redecorations. The Meeker family's house is now on the National Historic Register and is currently undergoing restoration.

== Exterior ==
The house features white clapboard siding and ornate wooden trim around all the windows and below the eaves. There is a large front porch with a balcony on the second floor; a smaller balcony is located on the east side of the house on the second floor. A porte-cochere (carriage entrance) is found on the west side with wooden, circular stairs leading to the sun porch. Porches and balconies are decorated with wooden railings and pillars. The building's foundations are made of Wilkerson Sandstone, and a widow's walk tops the mansion itself.

Shortly after the house was finished the Meekers' contracted again with Farrell and Darmer to build them a conservatory heated by the same boiler as the Mansion. There was also a stable and chicken coop once located on the property. The annex buildings once attached to the Mansion were burned down by an arsonist in the 1980s.

== Interior ==
The mansion is four floors, with ceilings up to 12 feet (3.7 m) high on the first two. Six original fireplaces have hand-carved wooden mantels, ornate tile work from the American Encostic Tile Company, and mirrors. Speaking tubes were installed to aid communication within the mansion; gaslights were also originally fitted throughout. Most of the speaking tubes were cut off at the wall while the house was a nursing home as the whistling scared the patients. Originally each room in the family wing of the house would have had picture rail, decorated metal doorknobs and hinges, built-in bolt locks on the doors, and inside wooden shutters. The ceilings are decorated with frescos and frieze work created by American painter Frederick Nelson Atwood Jr. The house has interior plumbing with hot and cold running water on four floors and would have had tin bathtubs. Leaded, stained glass windows are framed with ash and walnut.

The Basement has five rooms for fruit, dairy, washing, a boiler, and storage room. According to letters sent by Ezra to his daughter Caroline Osborne his eldest son, Marion Jasper Meeker, and grandson, Ezra Blane Meeker, may have lived for a short while in one or more of the basement rooms.

The main floor consists of the drawing room, parlor, library, a bathroom, dining room, kitchen, pantry, hallway, and sun room. The drawing room is fitted with teakwood flooring. The parlor has cedar paneling, while the library has redwood. The main entrance to the building was in the hallway, consisting of double doors of walnut with panels of leaded, stained glass. The main stairway had a newel post of hand-carved cherry wood, and the railing and balustrades of the stairway were hand-turned cherry wood. A large stained glass window was on the west side of the hallway and also made up part of the sun room. Double sliding doors open off the hall into the parlor and the drawing room. A third set of double sliding doors connect the parlor and the library.

The servants' stairway starts in the kitchen and ascends to the third floor and down into the basement. The second floor servants' quarters has two small rooms which were designed for servants but with no existing records of the Meekers' servants their use remains a mystery. The master bedroom includes a small adjacent dressing room which had a built-in wardrobe closet. The billiard room has a fireplace mantel, window casings, and baseboards of curly maple. A large bathroom, the Balcony Bedroom, and the Yellow room are on the second floor.

The attic is located on the third floor and includes four rooms under the eaves to the west and south, which were designed for servants. There is no evidence that servants ever lived on this floor but based on stories of the Meeker Family and descents it is known that the Meeker grandchildren used to use this floor to play and would even hold small plays. The wire for the curtain still hangs across archives. In the 1903 listing of the Meeker Mansion the relators list the top floor of the Mansion as being a billiard room. The stairway to the widow's walk was on the third floor.

== Historical significance ==
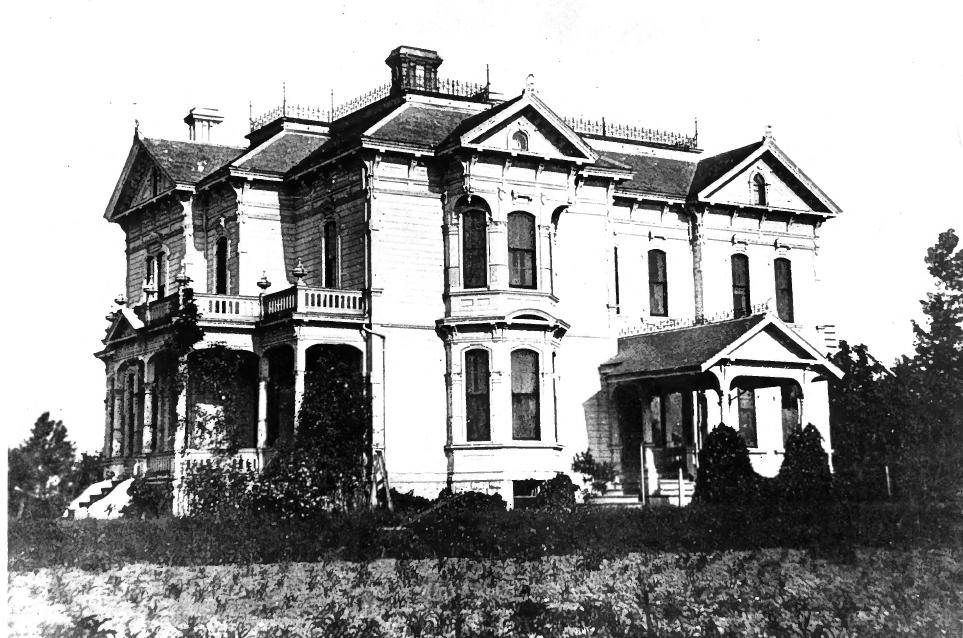
The Mansion pictured around 1900

The Ezra Meeker Mansion was built in the Italianate Victorian style, of which it displays many elements including high-quality imported fireplaces; leaded stained glass windows, and unusual woods used throughout the interior. The house is one of the markers of the Oregon Trail.

== Bibliography ==
- McDonald, Lucille, Where the Washingtonians Lived, Seattle: Superior Publishing Company, c. 1969, p. 177
- Meeker, Ezra, The Busy Life of Eighty-Five Years, Indianapolis: William B. Burford Press, c. 1916
- Meeker, Ezra, and Howard R. Driggs, Ox-Team Days on the Oregon Trail, World Book Company, c. 1922
- Young, Robert W., Ezra Meeker in the Puyallup Valley, Seattle: August 1949
