= Samuel the Lamanite =

Book of Mormon prophet

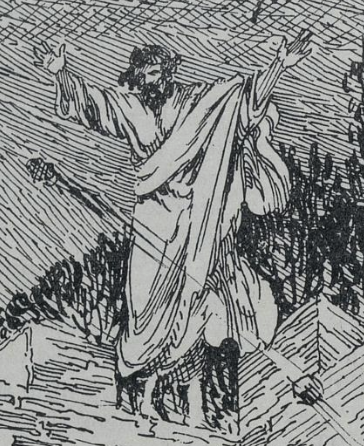
- From The Warning of Samuel the Lamanite (November 1925)
- First appearance: Helaman 13
- Last appearance: Helaman 16:8
- Affiliation: Lamanites

According to the Book of Mormon, Samuel the Lamanite is a prophet who lived in the ancient Americas, sent by Jesus Christ around 5 BC to teach and warn the Nephites just before his birth in the Old World. The account is recorded in Helaman 13–16.

== Ministry ==
Samuel first appears in Helaman 13. Samuel is notable in the Book of Mormon as he is a Lamanite prophet. Most prophets that appear in the book are Nephites.

After attempting to preach to the people in Zarahemla, and being rejected, he was told by revelation to return and prophesy to the people. He was not allowed into the city. In one of the more iconic stories of the Book of Mormon, he preached on the wall of the city, calling the people to repentance for their sins, prophesying about the impending advent of Jesus Christ in the Old World, and warning of the destruction of the Nephite nation. The people in the city tried to kill him by throwing stones and shooting arrows, but he was protected from harm by divine providence.

Angered by his preaching, the Nephites of Zarahemla throw rocks at Samuel and try to kill him. When his sermon is finished, Samuel flees the land of the Nephites and returns to Lamanite territory where he ministers to his people and "was never heard of more among the Nephites".

Highlights in the Ministry of Samuel the Lamanite
Prophecy of Samuel to the Nephites	Helaman 13-15
Comes into Zarahemla	Helaman 13:2
Speaks words of the Lord	Helaman 13:5
Foretells signs of Christ's birth	Helaman 14:2–6
Foretells signs of Christ's death	Helaman 14:14–28
Teaches of resurrection and redemption	Helaman 14:15–19
Those who believe desire baptism	Helaman 16:1–3
Many are angry and try to kill Samuel	Helaman 16:2–6
Flees	Helaman 16:7
Prophecies all fulfilled	3 Nephi 23:7–10

== In popular media ==
In 1997, Donny Osmond left his starring role in the tour of Joseph and the Amazing Technicolor Dreamcoat to play the role of Samuel the Lamanite in the Hill Cumorah Pageant.

== See also ==
- Book of Helaman (from The Book of Mormon)
