= Hill Cumorah Pageant =

Dramatic presentation by the Church of Jesus Christ of Latter-day Saints (1937–2019)

- Hill Cumorah Pageant logo
- Written by: The Church of Jesus Christ of Latter-day Saints
- Subject: Ancient American events reported in the Book of Mormon, the visitation of Christ to the American continent following his resurrection, and the restoration of the Gospel in the latter days.
- Genre: Religion
- Setting: Foot of the Hill Cumorah in Palmyra, New York, United States

Premiere
- Date: July 23, 1937
- www.hillcumorah.org/Pageant/

The Hill Cumorah Pageant was a theatrical production that was produced annually by the Church of Jesus Christ of Latter-day Saints (LDS Church), staged at the foot of the Hill Cumorah in Palmyra, New York. Premiering in 1937, it was considered to be the flagship pageant of the LDS Church.

It depicts Joseph Smith's encounter with the golden plates (translated into English as the Book of Mormon), as well as a dramatization of the events recorded therein. The productions featured more than 700 cast members, 1,300 costumes, and a 10-level stage. It ran for seven nights in late July and attracted approximately 35,000 viewers annually. No donations were accepted and no tickets were required, although seating was first-come, first-served.

The pageant was performed for the last time in 2019. The LDS Church announced plans to discontinue the event after 2020 due to new directives discouraging large-scale pageants. The final performance was postponed to 2021 due to the COVID-19 pandemic, but was later canceled in full.

== History ==
The pageant traces its roots to the early 1920s and the "Cumorah Conference" of the Eastern States Mission, which was held each year annually in late July. Mission president B. H. Roberts would take some of his missionaries from New York City and travel to Palmyra and the recently acquired Smith Family Farm to celebrate Pioneer Day, acting out scenes from the Book of Mormon and LDS Church history as part of the commemoration. Over the next decade, the conference grew in duration and scale, and New York University English professor H. Wayne Driggs wrote the script America's Witness for Christ for the first official performance of the Hill Cumorah Pageant, which premiered on July 23, 1937.

The pageant advanced technologically over the next few decades, with stereophonic sound inventor Harvey Fletcher designing, building, and installing a five-track recording system; and Crawford Gates composing an original score for the pageant, which was recorded by the Mormon Tabernacle Choir and the Utah Symphony Orchestra in 1957. In 1973, LDS Church president Harold B. Lee visited the pageant and called for a phasing out of full-time missionaries in the pageant. Consequently, the cast has since consisted entirely of regular church members. In 1988, author Orson Scott Card was tasked with writing a new script. He was instructed to make the script "accessible to a modern audience, targeting the non-scripture-reading, non-Mormon young adult," which he did in part by making the new version approximately 40 minutes shorter than the previous one.

In 1991, local service organizations were invited to provide snacks and meals to pageant visitors. The offer was accepted by Rotary International, Lions Clubs International, and Kiwanis International, which turned the pageant into their primary annual fund-raising event. In 1997, Donny Osmond left his starring role in the tour of Joseph and the Amazing Technicolor Dreamcoat to participate with his family in the cast of the pageant. Osmond played the role of the prophet Samuel the Lamanite.

During the 2012 season, the pageant held festivities and reunions in commemoration of its 75th anniversary.

Brent Hanson, a faculty member at Southern Virginia University, served as the pageant's artistic director from 2005 until 2018. Starting at the end of the 2018 season, Utah educator Shawnda Moss replaced Hanson as artistic director.

The New York Times contrasted the pageant's sincerity with the raucous tone of another major production, the satirical Broadway musical The Book of Mormon.

It was previously announced that 2020 would be the pageant's last year, as a result of new directives by the Church to discourage large-scale pageants. Due to the COVID-19 pandemic, this was initially delayed to 2021. However in March 2021, the Church announced that the pageant had been cancelled and would not be rescheduled, thus ending its 82-year run. Commemorations (including an online stream of the 2019 edition) will be held to celebrate the history of the event.

== Scenes ==
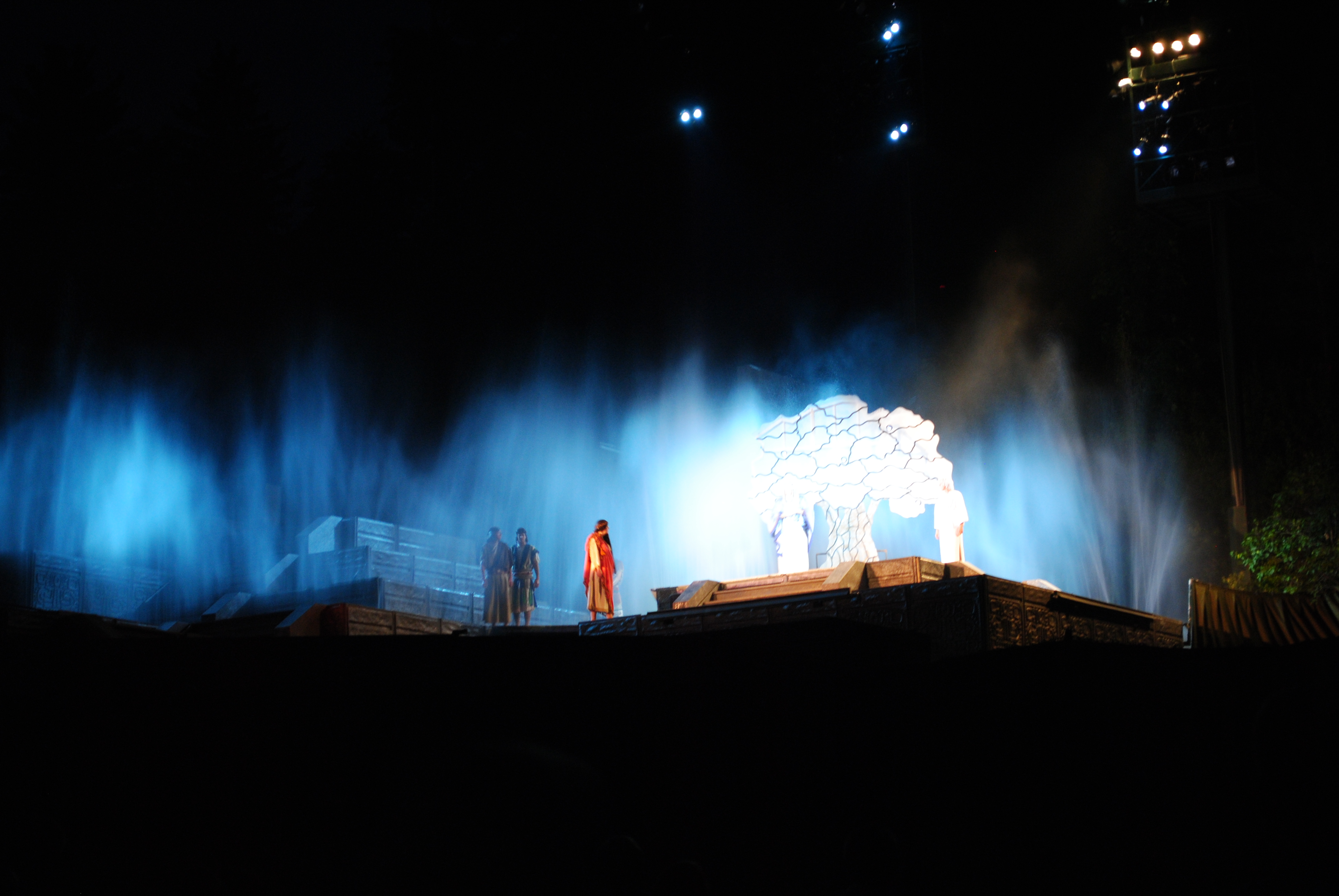
A scene in the Hill Cumorah Pageant depicting Nephi's vision of the Tree of Life

The pageant was 70 minutes in duration and depicted the overarching story of the Book of Mormon, which Mormons believe Joseph Smith translated from golden plates he received from an angel on the Hill Cumorah itself. The pageant also included the story of Smith's encounter with the angel Moroni.

The script for the pageant was taken from the Bible and the Book of Mormon, including ten short story scenes:

1. The Prophet Lehi
2. The Visions of Christ
3. The Building of a Ship
4. The Voyage to Ancient America
5. The Burning of Abinadi
6. The Ministry of Alma
7. The Prophecy: A Day, A Night and a Day
8. The Resurrected Christ Appears to Ancient Americans
9. The Written Word: A Golden Message
10. The Restoration of Christ's Kingdom

== Cast, setting, and special effects ==
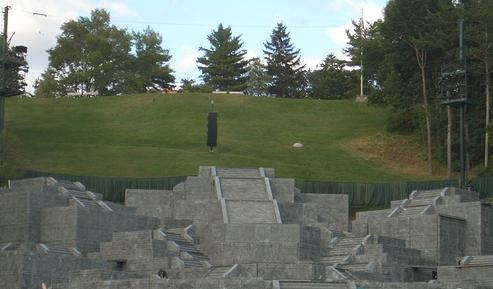
Stage of the pageant on the Hill Cumorah

The pageant's cast included approximately 700 people. Prospective cast members, many from outside New York State, applied online between the previous August and November. Since the pageant soundtrack was prerecorded by professional actors, with singing by the Mormon Tabernacle Choir, cast members needed only to memorize movements and follow cues. The show opened after only a week of intensive rehearsals, and it closed after seven performances.

Over 1,300 costumes were utilized for the pageant, which played out on a 10-level stage. Special effects included earthquakes, floods, and fireballs.

There were 8,000 chairs available for audience seating in a large outdoor "bowl" at the foot of the stage, which was built on many levels up the side of the hill. Audience members could also bring their own chairs and blankets. Parking was available for 3,000 cars. The pageant attracted approximately 35,000 visitors annually.
