= Cumorah =

Drumlin associated with the Latter Day Saint movement

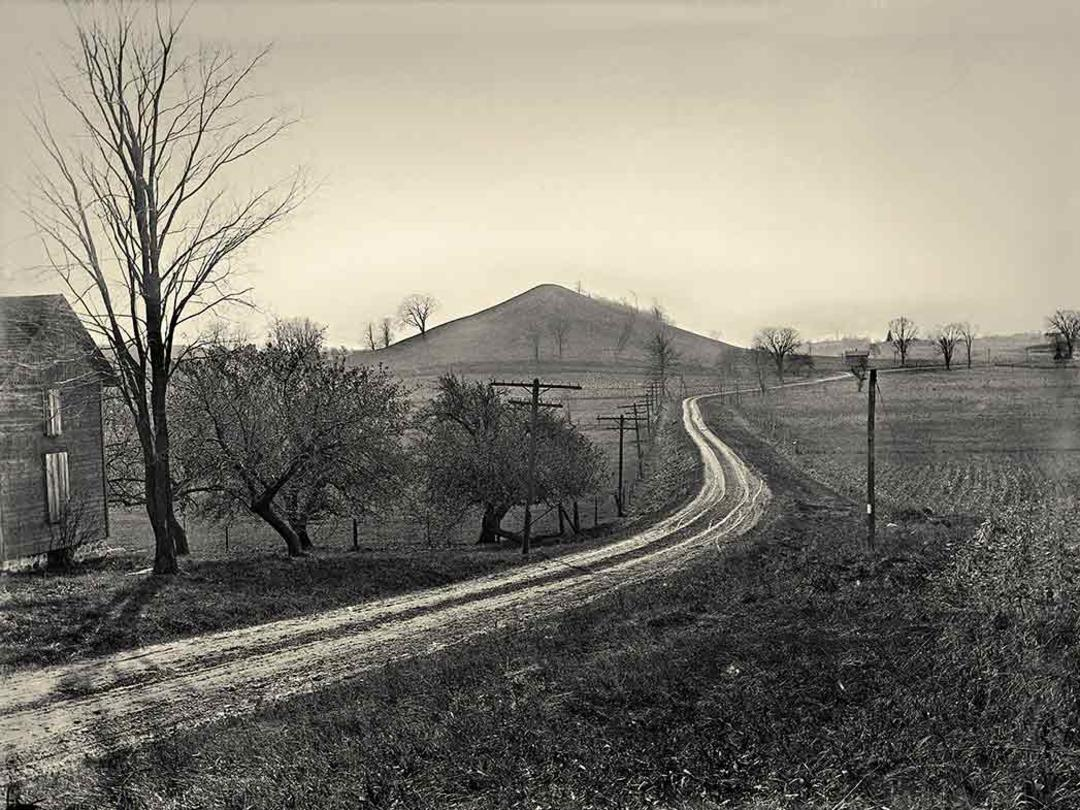
- Photograph of the hill by George Edward Anderson, 1907

Highest point
- Elevation: 682 feet (208 m)
- Coordinates: 43°00′23″N 77°13′27″W

Geography
- Location within New York Adirondack Park Location within the United States
- Location: Manchester, Ontario County, New York, U.S.
- Topo map: USGS Clifton Springs

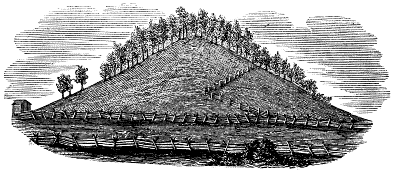
An 1841 engraving of Cumorah (looking south), where Joseph Smith said he was given golden plates by an angel named Moroni, on the west side, near the peak

Cumorah (/kəˈmɔːrə/) is a drumlin in Manchester, New York, United States, where Joseph Smith said he found a set of golden plates which he also said he translated into English and published as the Book of Mormon.

In the text of the Book of Mormon, "Cumorah" is a hill located in a land of the same name, which is "a land of many waters, rivers and fountains". In this hill, a Book of Mormon figure, Mormon, deposited a number of metal plates containing the record of his nation of Nephites, just prior to their final battle with the Lamanites in which at least 230,000 people were killed.

Early Latter Day Saints believed that the Cumorah in New York was the same Cumorah described in the Book of Mormon as taught by Assistant President of the Church Oliver Cowdery in a formal letter (Letter VII) he published in the July 1835 Messenger and Advocate and reprinted several times at the direction of Joseph Smith. Joseph Smith explained that Moroni identified the hill as Cumorah before Joseph found the plates (Doctrine and Covenants 128:20), which was corroborated by other historical sources. In the early 20th century, scholars from the Reorganized Church of Jesus Christ of Latter Day Saints (RLDS Church) and the Church of Jesus Christ of Latter-day Saints (LDS Church) began to speculate that there were two such hills and that the final battle in the Book of Mormon took place on a hill in southern Mexico, Central America, or South America. The LDS Church has no official position on the matter, and while these hypotheses are not held by some leaders and members of the LDS Church, they are firmly espoused by others.

In the official account of Joseph Smith it is stated that Manchester, Ontario County, New York, is the location of the encounter with Angel Moroni.

== New York ==
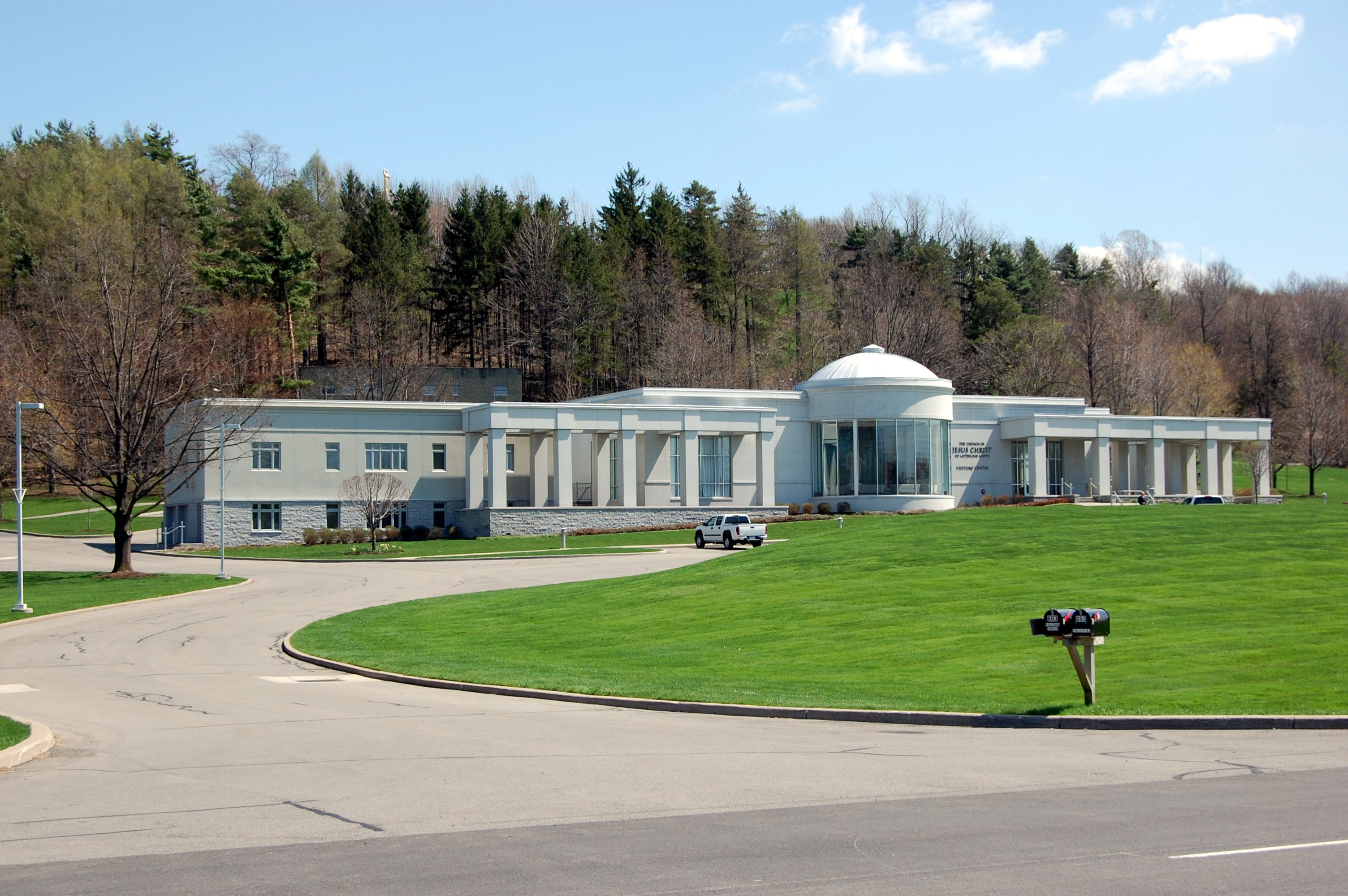
Visitor center of the Church of Jesus Christ of Latter-day Saints at Hill Cumorah (New York)

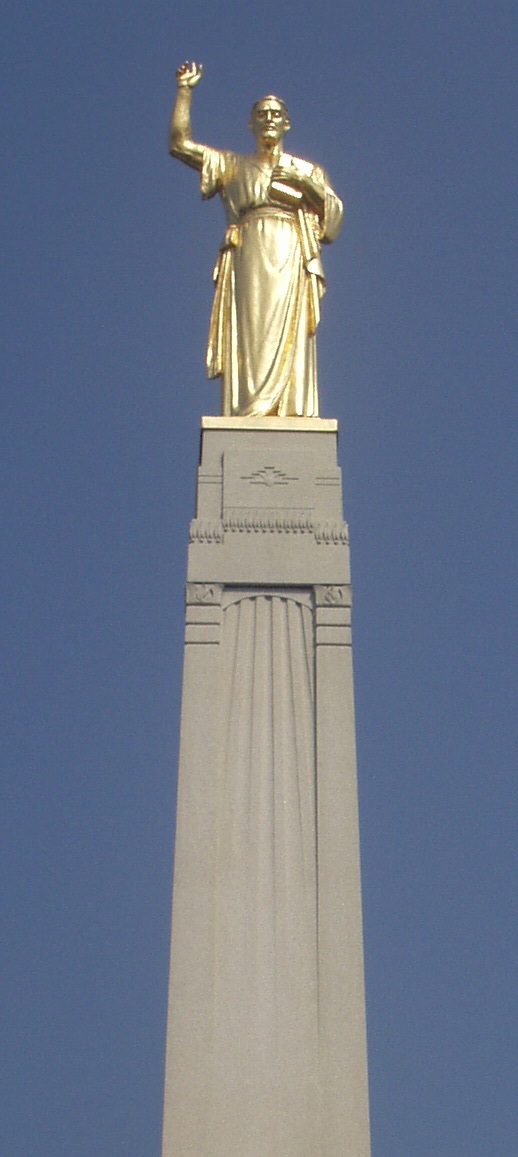
The statue of Moroni atop Hill Cumorah in Western New York

The tradition of the Latter Day Saint movement holds that the hill named Cumorah in Manchester, New York, is where Joseph Smith received the golden plates which contained the writings of the Book of Mormon. Smith wrote: "On the west side of this hill, not far from the top, under a stone of considerable size, lay the plates, deposited in a stone box."

Smith visited the hill each year on September 22 between 1823 and 1827 and said he was instructed by a "holy messenger", whom the prophet identified as the Angel Moroni. The prophet was finally allowed to take the record on September 22, 1827. Eleven other men gave written testimony that they had also seen the plates and held them in their hands.

The hill, which was known as Cumorah by the Smith family prior to 1829, is situated 3 miles from Smith's boyhood home on a farm that was then owned by a local farmer, Alonzo Sanders. This farm was 4 miles (6.4 km) south of Palmyra, on the main road toward Canandaigua from Palmyra to Manchester, and is not far from Carangrie Creek and the Clyde River. According to geologists, the hill was formed during the retreat of the Ice Age glaciers, and it rises approximately 110 feet (34 m) above the surrounding valley floor.

Since 1829, the Latter Day Saints have called the hill "Cumorah", and local non-members have derogatorily called it "Mormon Hill" or "Gold Bible Hill". The hill has also been called "Inspiration Point". The hill and surrounding land was purchased in the 1920s by the Church of Jesus Christ of Latter-day Saints under the direction of church president Heber J. Grant. The transaction involved two separate purchases: the purchase of the "Inglis farm"; and the purchase of the "Sexton farm". The Inglis farm consisted of 96 acres (39 ha) on both sides of the Canandaigua–Palmyra road and encompassed one third of the western edge of the hill. The 187-acre (76 ha) Sexton farm was purchased from the heirs of Pliny T. Sexton, who owned the "Mormon Hill farm" encompassing the remainder of the hill.

The Church has constructed a monument that is topped with a statue representing the Angel Moroni on the top of the hill, and there is a visitor's interpretative center at the base of the hill.

On June 8, 2022, several shots were fired into the Hill Cumorah visitors center. There were no injuries or fatalities, and investigators determined the shots were unintentional and came from target shooting on nearby farmland.

=== Supposed location of the plates ===
The stone box, described by Joseph Smith as the location where the plates were found, has not been located on the hill. In a letter, Oliver Cowdery gives the location as "the west side of the hill, not far from the top". Shortly after Smith announced he had the plates, some local residents unsuccessfully searched the hill for a freshly dug hole that could have contained the plates. They did note a significantly sized hole on the east side of the hill that had been dug years previously by treasure seekers.

== Book of Mormon ==
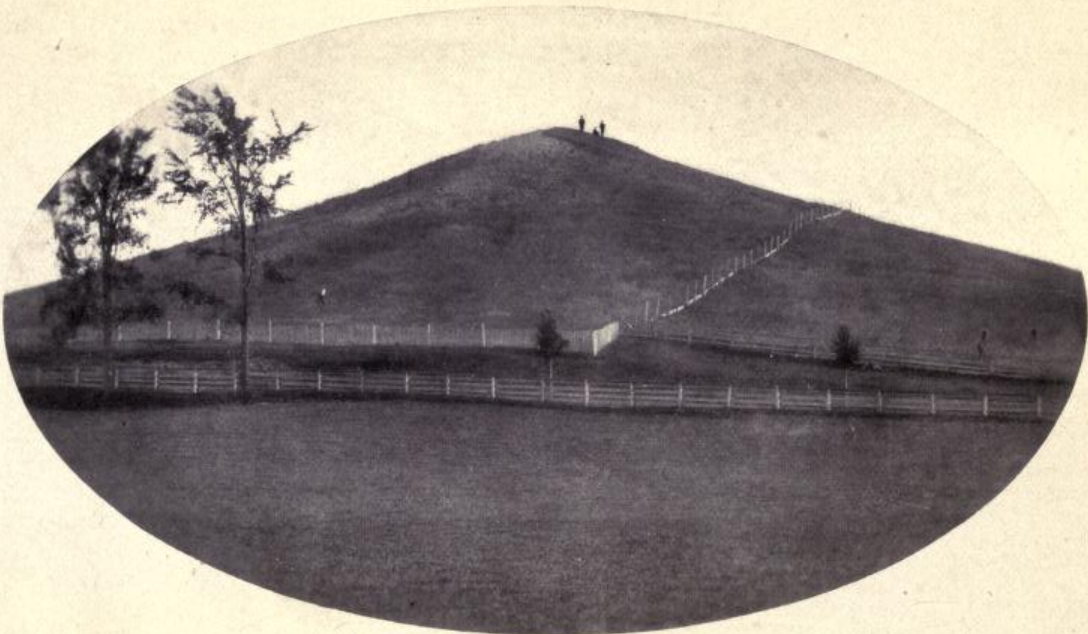
Hill Cumorah, c. 1910

=== Nephites ===
In the Book of Mormon, Cumorah is mentioned in six verses, five in chapter 6 and one in chapter 8 of a subpart of the book, which is also known as the Book of Mormon. According to the record, Mormon is one of the final caretakers of the records of his people. He combined and abridged the records and engraved them on gold plates. His people, called the Nephites, were near to being destroyed by the Lamanites who had had many previous wars with the Nephites. Mormon wrote to the leader of the Lamanites to ask that he may gather his "people unto the land of Cumorah, by a hill which was called Cumorah, and there we could give them battle." Cumorah is described as being in a land with "many waters, rivers, and fountains".

The leader of the Lamanites agreed, and all of the Nephites gathered together, including their women and children. Mormon wrote, "And when three hundred and eighty and four years had passed away [since the sign of the birth of Christ], we had gathered in all the remainder of our people unto the land of Cumorah." Mormon then hid all of the records of his people in the hill, except for the plates that he was currently writing on, which he gave to his son Moroni.

The Lamanites then attacked the Nephites, who were led by twenty-three men each with ten thousand men under their command. Mormon recorded that all but 24 of the Nephites had been killed, "even all my people, save it were those twenty and four who were with me", except for those who fled to the south or defected to the Lamanites.

Mormon then records his mourning for his people and a last message to those who will read his record later, then again turns the unburied records over to his son Moroni. Moroni records, "after the great and tremendous battle at Cumorah, behold, the Nephites who had escaped into the country southward were hunted by the Lamanites, until they were all destroyed. And my father also was killed by them, and I even remain alone to write the sad tale of the destruction of my people."

=== Jaredites ===
This hill, known as "Cumorah" among the Nephites, was called "Ramah" (/ˈrɑːmɑː/) by the Jaredites:

In the Book of Mormon, during the time of the Book of Alma, the land of Cumorah was part of the land of Desolation, "the land which had been peopled and been destroyed, of whose bones we have spoken". This land is identified as being north of the land of Zarahemla.

Moroni lived several years after recording the destruction of his people. He translated and abridged the plates which were the record of the Jaredites as the Book of Ether on to the plates that he was keeping. During this process, he wrote, "Omer ... passed by the hill of Shim, and came over by the place where the Nephites were destroyed," and "it came to pass that the army of Coriantumr did pitch their tents by the hill Ramah; and it was that same hill where my father Mormon did hide up the records unto the Lord, which were sacred." These passages identify the Nephite hill Cumorah as the same hill where the Jaredites had fought their final battle. Oliver Cowdery explained that this record "was written and deposited not far from" [Joseph Smith's home], indicating that both Mormon and Moroni lived in the vicinity of Palmyra, New York.

== Geography and historicity ==
For over 100 years, Mormons generally accepted the New York setting for the Hill Cumorah. Since the early-20th century, there has been discussion within the Latter Day Saint movement about whether Hill Cumorah in New York is the same place described in the Book of Mormon, or whether there are two hills of the same name—one in New York and one in either Southern Mexico, Central America, or South America. Mormon archeologists overwhelmingly favor the "two Cumorahs" theory, while conservative theologians and some leaders prefer the view that only one Cumorah exists. Some non-Mormon scholars have provided alternative theories for the origin of the name Cumorah.

=== New York hill ===
At least ten different accounts refer to certain events that occurred at the hill Cumorah in New York. According to the account of Brigham Young, the angel instructed Joseph Smith to carry the golden plates back to the hill Cumorah. When Smith and Oliver Cowdery arrived, "the hill opened, and they walked into a cave, in which there was a large and spacious room." The account continues by saying they found "more plates than probably many wagon loads; they were piled up in the corners and along the walls." When they first entered, the Sword of Laban was hanging on the wall. When they re-entered later, the Sword of Laban was unsheathed and resting on top of the newly delivered golden plates. The sword had an inscription on it that said the sword "will never be sheathed again until the kingdoms of this world become the kingdom of our God and his Christ." It has been suggested by Mesoamerican Cumorah advocates that these events occurred in a vision rather than a physical visit.

There has been no on-site archaeological research at Cumorah in New York.

=== Cerro El Vigia ===
For a variety of reasons, some Mormon scholars have proposed the Cerro El Vigia (coordinates: 18°33′N 95°11′W or 18°27′25″N 95°21′01″W ) in Veracruz, Mexico, as the hill Cumorah in the Book of Mormon. John L. Sorenson has listed 15 cultural criteria for the hill Cumorah which are based on contextual clues from the text of the Book of Mormon: cities, towers, agriculture, metallurgy, formal political states, organized religion, idolatry, crafts, trade, writing, weaponry, astronomy, calendar systems, cement, and wheels. Sorensen alleges that the hill in New York at least partly fits four of these requirements while the Cerro El Vigia meets all of them.

According to David Palmer, a list of topographic and geographic criteria for Cumorah has been developed. These criteria are as follows:

1. It was near an eastern seacoast (Ether 9–3).
2. It was near a narrow neck of land (Alma 22:29–32, Mormon 2:29, Mormon 3:5, Alma 43, Alma 56, Alma 50:33–34, Alma 52:9, Mormon 3:5–7, Alma 63:5, Ether 10:22–28).
3. It was on a coastal plain, and possibly near other mountains and valleys (Ether 14:12–15).
4. It was one day's journey south (east-south-east in modern coordinates) of a large body of water (Ether 15:8–11).
5. It was in an area of many rivers and waters (Mormon 6:4).
6. It was in the presence of fountains (Mormon 6:4).
7. The abundance of water apparently provided a military advantage (Mormon 6:4).
8. There was an escape route to the land ("country") southward (Mormon 8:2).
9. The hill was large enough to provide a view of hundreds of thousands of bodies (Mormon 6:11).
10. The hill was apparently a significant landmark (Ether 9; Mormon 6:6).
11. The hill was apparently free standing so people could camp around it (Mormon 6:2, Mormon 6:11).
12. The climate was apparently temperate with no record of cold or snow (Enos 1:20, Alma 46:40)
13. The hill was located in a volcanic zone susceptible to earthquakes (3 Nephi 8:6–23)

=== Alternative origin of the name ===
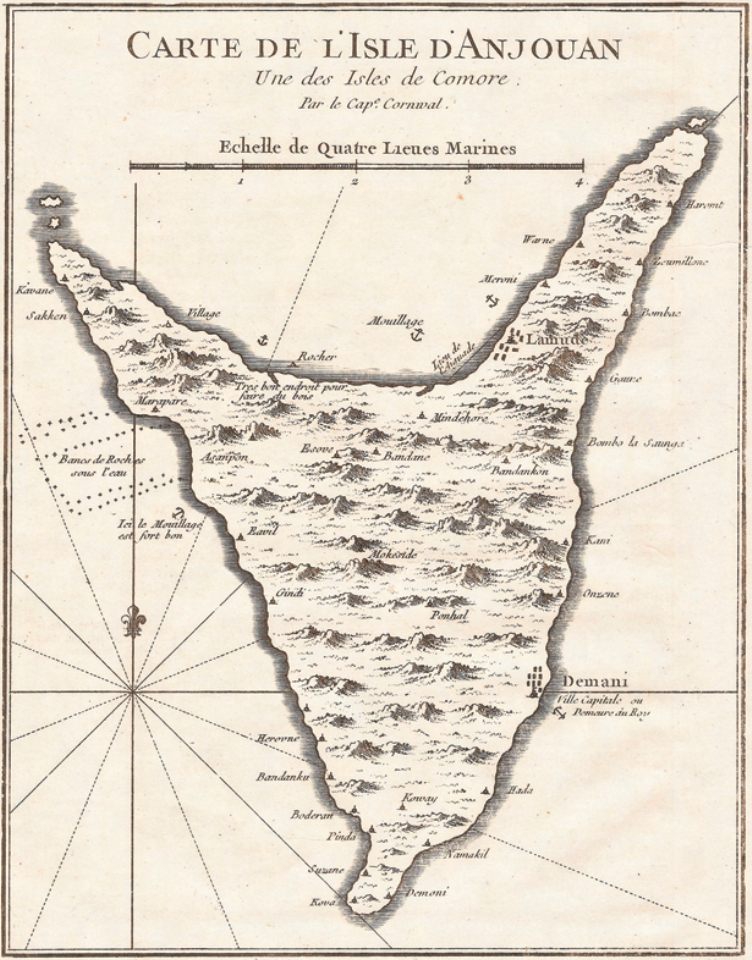
Meroni, Comoros, appears on a 1748 map by French hydrographer Jacques Nicolas Bellin.

Grant H. Palmer suggested that Smith borrowed the name "Cumorah" through his study of the treasure-hunting stories of Captain William Kidd. Previous to announcing his discovery of the Book of Mormon, Smith had spent several years employed as a treasure seeker in Chenango County, New York. Kidd is considered to have started the treasure digging phenomenon after burying treasure on Gardiner's Island in New York, which was later recovered by the colonial governor of New York. Capt. Kidd had buried this treasure after returning from an Indian Ocean voyage where he lost a third of his crew to cholera on the Comoros islands. Palmer suggested that Smith borrowed the name of a settlement in the Comoros—Moroni—and applied it to the angel who showed him where to find the golden plates buried in the Hill Cumorah.

FAIR, the Latter-day Saint apologetics organization, contends at length that the connection is tenuous.

=== Alternate LDS archaeological view ===
Mormon authors have suggested that the ancestors of the Nephite people may have encountered the Comoros islands on their initial voyage from the Arabian Peninsula to the western hemisphere, and that the Nephite civilization therefore may have retained a collective knowledge of the names "Comoros" and "Moroni".

A minority of LDS scholars, some of whom specialize in 19th-century American literature, place the original literary setting for the Book of Mormon among the mythic mound builders of North America.

== Popular culture ==
=== Literary interpretation ===
Charles W. Dunn depicts Coriantumr's last battle in his book The Master's Other Sheep: An Epic of America and Other Poems. In an analysis of Dunn's poem, professor of English Edward Whitley highlights the significance that the Hill Ramah is portrayed as being the same as the Hill Cumorah, where the Nephites are also destroyed. He explores the hill's role in the Book of Mormon's destruction of purported ancient American peoples, namely the Nephites and the Jaredites, and how that is portrayed in literature.

=== Pageant ===
The 283-acre (1.15 km^{2}) site near Palmyra, New York, formerly hosted the annual Hill Cumorah Pageant. This large, outdoor Latter-day Saint pageant typically occurred in early July and was free to the public. The pageant was sponsored by the LDS Church and traced its history back to 1935. The tradition of staging the play America's Witness for Christ began in 1937. This was a play by H. Wayne Driggs that remained the basic text of the pageant until 1987. The 1987 revision, which was used through the final performance, was written in large part by Orson Scott Card. It was announced that 2020 would be the pageant's last year as a result of new directives by the church to discourage large-scale pageants.

Due to the COVID-19 pandemic, this final performance was initially rescheduled for mid-2021 and later canceled entirely, bringing the tradition to an end.

== Notes ==
=== Works cited ===
- Brooke, John L. (1994). The Refiner's Fire: The Making of Mormon Cosmology, 1644–1844. Cambridge: Cambridge University Press. ISBN 0-521-34545-6.
- Bushman, Richard Lyman (2005). Joseph Smith: Rough Stone Rolling. New York: Alfred A. Knopf. ISBN 1-4000-4270-4.
- Newell, Linda King; Avery, Valeen Tippetts (1994). Mormon Enigma: Emma Hale Smith (2nd ed.). University of Illinois Press. ISBN 0-252-06291-4.
- Persuitte, David (2000). Joseph Smith and the origins of the Book of Mormon. Jefferson, North Carolina: McFarland & Co. ISBN 0-7864-0826-X.
- Quinn, D. Michael (1998). Early Mormonism and the Magic World View (2nd ed.). Salt Lake City: Signature Books. ISBN 1-56085-089-2.
