= Angel Moroni =

Angel in Latter Day Saint Theology who visited Joseph Smith

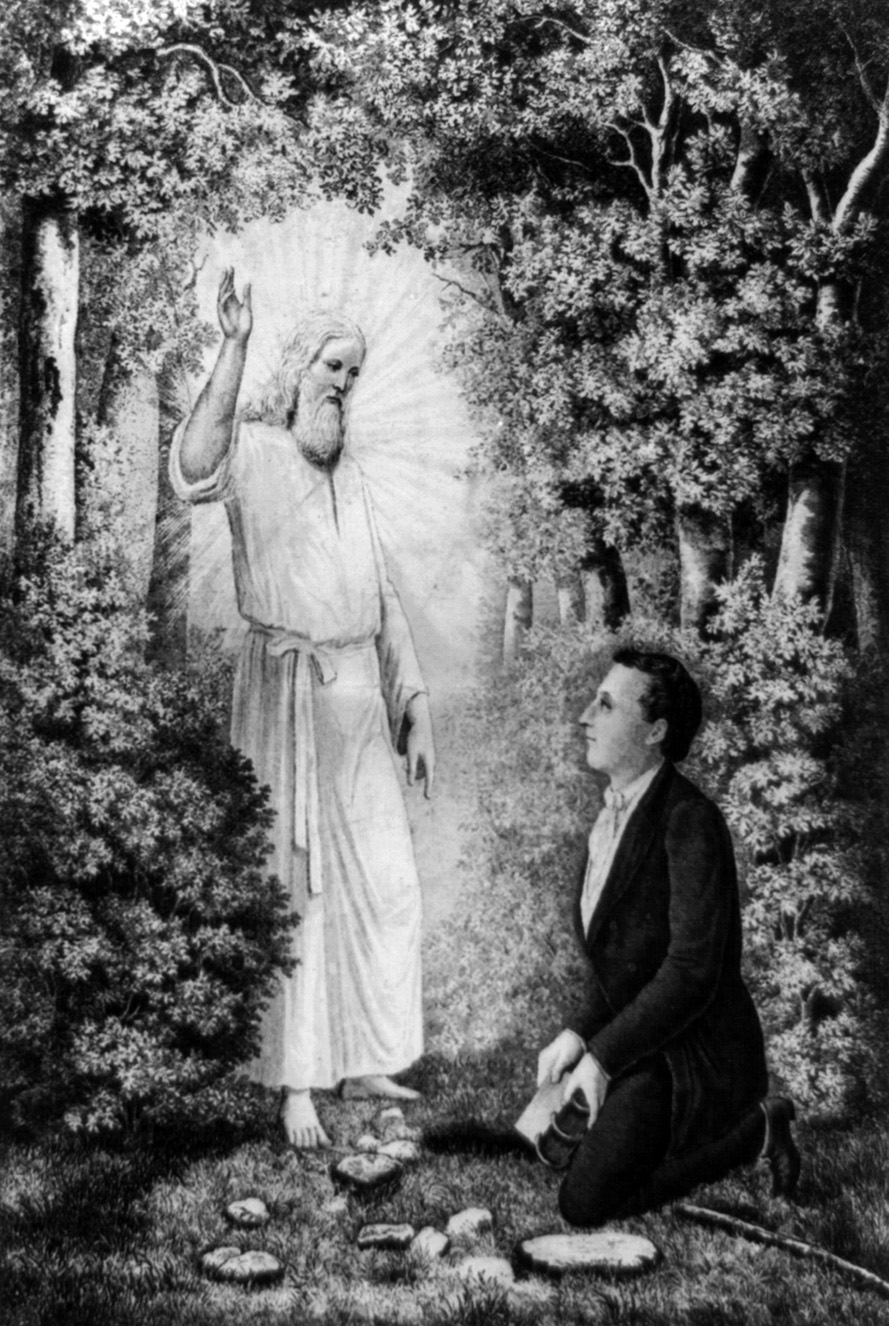
The angel Moroni directs Joseph Smith to the plates of the Book of Mormon.

The angel Moroni (/moʊˈroʊnaɪ/) is an angel whom Joseph Smith, founder of the Latter Day Saint movement, said visited Smith on numerous occasions, beginning on September 21, 1823. According to Smith, the angel Moroni was the guardian (tutelary spirit) of the golden plates buried near his home in western New York, which Latter Day Saints believe were the source of the Book of Mormon. An important figure in the theology of the Latter Day Saint movement, Moroni is featured prominently in its architecture and art. Besides Smith, the Three Witnesses and several other witnesses also reported that they saw Moroni in visions in 1829.

Moroni is thought by Latter Day Saints to be the same person as a Book of Mormon prophet-warrior named Moroni, who was the last to write in the golden plates. According to the Book of Mormon, the angel Moroni was a pre-Columbian warrior who buried the golden plates. After he died, he became an angel who was tasked with directing Smith to their location in the 1820s. According to Smith, he then returned the golden plates to Moroni after they were translated and, as of 1838, Moroni still had the plates in his possession.

== Angel's name and identity ==
Initially, Smith said he received the golden plates from "an angel" but gave no name. Thus, in an 1831 letter from Lucy Mack Smith to her brother, she discusses Moroni as the person who buried the plates, but does not identify him as the unnamed "holy angel" that gave Smith the means to translate them. In Smith's 1832 (second-hand, but officially authorized) history, he said he was visited by "an angel of the Lord", who mentioned the Book of Mormon prophet "Moroni" as the last engraver of the golden plates.

The earliest extant identification of the angel as Moroni appears in Eber D. Howe's book Mormonism Unvailed, published in 1834. The earliest recorded instance of Smith identifying the angel as Moroni occurred in 1835, while preparing the first edition of the Doctrine and Covenants, in which Smith indicated a number of angels who would come to the earth after the Second Coming and drink sacramental wine with himself and Oliver Cowdery. Around this time, Cowdery was writing a history of Smith in which he identified the angel as the prophet Moroni from the Book of Mormon. In July 1838, Smith wrote in the church periodical Elders' Journal that "Moroni [was] the person who deposited the plates, from whence the book of Mormon was translated [...] and gave me directions how to obtain them".

On May 2, 1838, Smith began dictating a church history with James Mulholland as his scribe in which the angel is identified as "Nephi", which is the name of the Book of Mormon's first narrator. This was left unchanged when the 1838 history was published in 1842 in Times and Seasons and in Millennial Star. In 1851, a copy of the Times and Seasons 1842 account, repeating the identification of the angel as Nephi, appeared in a compilation of church documents titled the Pearl of Great Price published by Franklin D. Richards in Liverpool, England. Richard's compilation was later revised in 1878 and canonized by the Church of Jesus Christ of Latter-day Saints (LDS Church) in 1880, in which the angel was identified as Moroni. In 1853, Smith's mother Lucy Mack Smith published a history of her son with an extract of the 1838 history again using the name "Nephi". Mary Whitmer, mother to one of the Three Witnesses and four of the Eight Witnesses, said she had a vision of the golden plates, shown to her by an angel whom she always called "Brother Nephi".

Based on Smith's other statements that the angel was Moroni, and based on both prior and later publications, most Latter Day Saints view Smith's 1838 identification of the angel as Nephi as a mistake on the part of the transcriber. In the version of Smith's 1838 history published by the LDS Church, as well as the portion canonized by that denomination as the Pearl of Great Price, the name "Nephi" has been changed by editors to read "Moroni". The Community of Christ publishes the original story, including the identification of "Nephi", but indicates "Moroni" in a footnote.

=== Theorized origin of the name ===
Commenting on the name of the angel Moroni, Grant H. Palmer speculates that Smith had read of the city Moroni on the island Comoros from either a map or tales of Captain William Kidd, popular at the time. According to Latter-day Saint scholar Hugh Nibley, the use of "mor" in the Book of Mormon is an Egyptian word, and means "beloved, good, everything nice and desirable."

== Description ==
In one of Smith's histories, he described him as an "angel of light" who "had on a loose robe of most exquisite whiteness. It was a whiteness beyond anything earthly I had ever seen .... His hands were naked and his arms also a little above the wrists .... Not only was his robe exceedingly white but his whole person was glorious beyond description". According to Smith's sister Katharine, the angel "was dressed in white raiment, of whiteness beyond anything Joseph had ever seen in his life, and had a girdle about his waist. He saw his hands and wrists, and they were pure and white".

== Appearances to Joseph Smith and others ==
Smith said that on the night of September 21, 1823, Moroni appeared to him and told him about the golden plates that were buried in a stone box a few miles from Smith's home. Smith said that the same angel visited him various times over the course of the next six years; Smith also said that the angel visited him to retrieve the golden plates after Smith had finished translating a portion of the writing on the plates into the Book of Mormon.

In addition to Smith, several other early Mormons said they had visions where they saw the angel Moroni. Three Witnesses said they saw the angel in 1829: Oliver Cowdery, David Whitmer, and Martin Harris. Other early Mormons who may have said they saw Moroni include:

- Hyrum Smith
- Luke S. Johnson
- Zera Pulsipher, later disputed.
- W. W. Phelps;
- John P. Greene and his wife Rhoda
- John Taylor
- Oliver Granger
- Heber C. Kimball
- Lucy Harris
- Harrison Burgess

Mary Whitmer may also have seen Moroni, although she referred to the angel she saw as "Brother Nephi".

== Mortal life of Moroni the prophet ==
According to the Book of Mormon, Moroni was the son of Mormon, the prophet for whom the Book of Mormon is named. Moroni may have been named after Captain Moroni, an earlier Book of Mormon figure. Before Mormon's death in battle, he passed the golden plates to Moroni. Moroni then finished writing on the plates and concluded the record, presumably burying them in the hill Cumorah in western New York. He is the namesake of the Book of Moroni in the Book of Mormon.

== Theological significance ==
Angel Moroni USVA headstone symbol

Because of his instrumentality in the restoration of the gospel, Moroni is commonly identified by Latter Day Saints as the angel mentioned in Revelation 14:6, "having the everlasting gospel to preach unto them that dwell on the earth, and to every nation, and kindred, and tongue, and people."

The image of the angel Moroni blowing a trumpet is commonly used as an unofficial symbol of the LDS Church. Moroni appears on the cover of some editions of the Book of Mormon. Statues of the angel stand atop many LDS temples, with most statues facing east.

In 2007, the LDS Church stated that an image of the angel Moroni in an advertisement violated one of the church's registered trademarks.

== Sculptors ==
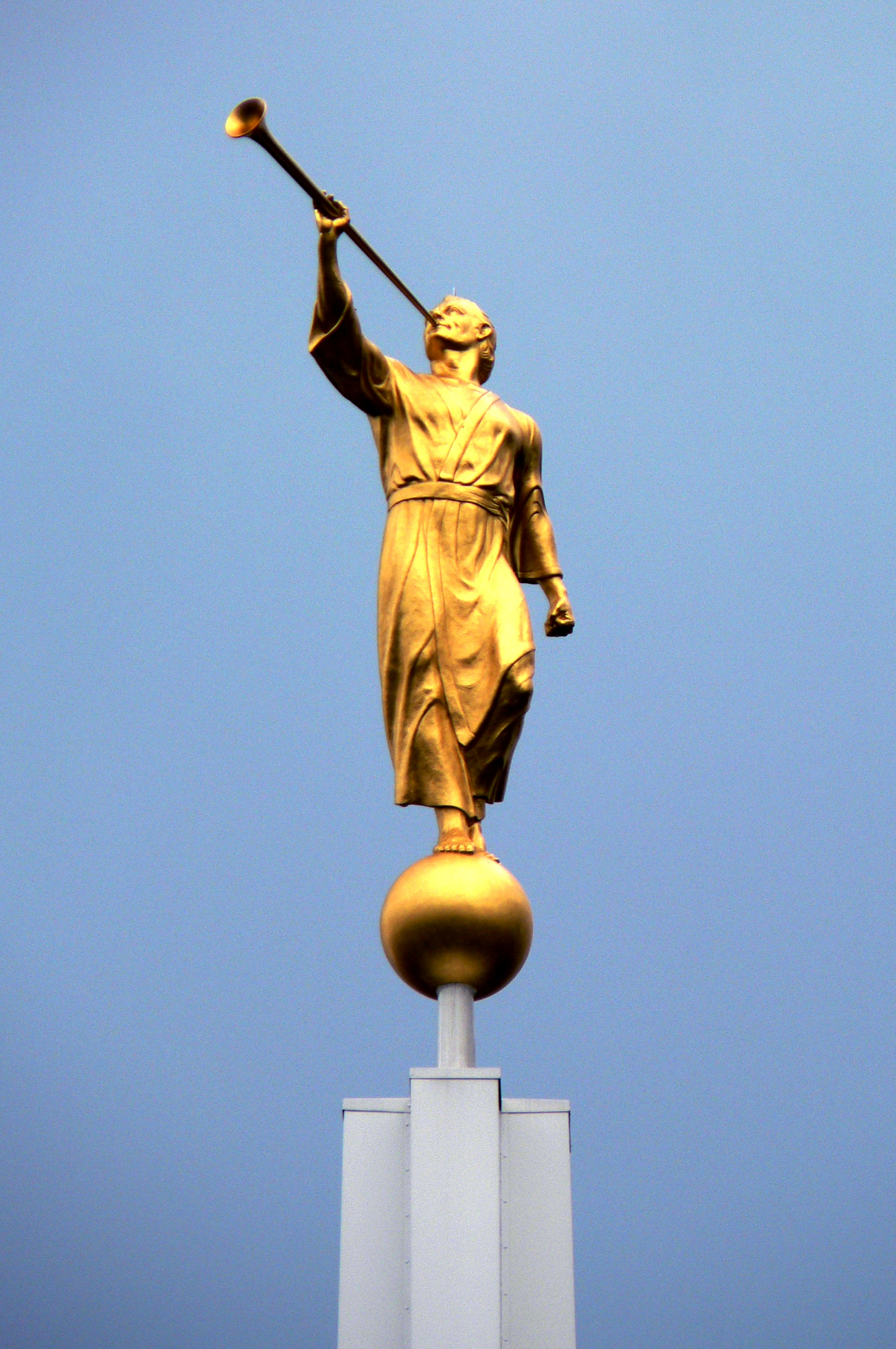
Bern Switzerland Temple statue of Angel Moroni

The Nauvoo Temple was the first Latter Day Saint temple to be crowned with a figure of an angel. This angel, not officially identified as Moroni, was a metal weathervane with gold leaf on the trumpet. It was designed by William Weeks (architect of the Nauvoo temple) and installed in January 1846. This figure was positioned in a flying horizontal position holding an open book in one hand and a trumpet in the other.

Cyrus Dallin sculpted the first angel which was identified as Moroni. This angel was placed on the Salt Lake Temple during the capstone ceremony on April 6, 1892, one year to the day before the temple was dedicated. Dallin's design is a neoclassical angel in robe and cap, standing upright with a trumpet in hand. It stands 3.8 meters high, was molded in hammered copper from the plaster original, and was covered with 22-karat gold leaf. On March 18, 2020, the trumpet held by the statue of Angel Moroni on the Salt Lake Temple fell to the ground as a result of a 5.7 magnitude earthquake.

Torleif S. Knaphus fashioned a replica of the Dallin angel in the 1930s, but the casting of his angel wasn't placed on a temple until many years later. In 1983, castings of this angel were placed on the Idaho Falls Temple and the Atlanta Temple.

Millard F. Malin's angel, which was placed on the Los Angeles Temple in 1953, is known as the second Angel Moroni statue. His angel was cast in aluminum, stands 4.7 meters high, and weighs 953 kilograms. Malin depicted Moroni with Native American features, wearing a Mayan style cloak, and holding the golden plates in its left hand.

Avard Fairbanks sculpted the third Angel Moroni statue, which was placed on the Washington D.C. Temple, dedicated in 1974. This angel was created as a one-meter model which was sent to Italy where it was enlarged, cast in bronze, and gilded. The finished statue is 5.5 meters high and weighs over 4,000 pounds (1,800 kg). The Seattle Washington, Jordan River Utah, and Mexico City Mexico temples each have a 4.6-meter casting of this statue.

Karl Quilter sculpted his first Angel Moroni in 1978. Two sizes were made, one three meters high, the other just over two meters. These statues were designed to reduce the cost and weight of the previous Angel Moroni statues, in order to become a standard part of the temple architecture. The Quilter angels are made of fiberglass and covered with gold leaf. In 1998, with the construction of many new smaller temples, Quilter was commissioned to create a new angel. This angel was similar in design to his previous angels, but he gave Moroni a slightly larger build, with his left hand opened and his body turned slightly to show more action. Quilter's Angel Moroni is now on over 100 temples around the world.

== See also ==
- List of angels in theology
