= Fourth Nephi =

Book of the Book of Mormon

The Book of Nephi: Who Is the Son of Nephi—One of the Disciples of Jesus Christ, usually referred to as Fourth Nephi or 4 Nephi (/ˈniːfaɪ/ NEE-fy), is a religious text of the Latter Day Saint movement which constitutes one of fifteen books that make up the Book of Mormon. This book was originally called "IV Nephi" in the 1879 edition, and "Fourth Nephi" in the 1920 edition of Book of Mormon.

Fourth Nephi is among the shorter books in the Book of Mormon, containing only a single chapter, but covers almost three centuries of the history of the Nephites and the Lamanites (c. 35 AD to 321 AD).

The book describes the period of time immediately following the visit of Jesus Christ to the Book of Mormon peoples, in which time the Nephites and the Lamanites are all converted to the Church of Christ. The Nephites stop obeying the law of Moses and begin to obey the commandments of Jesus instead. After the year AD 100, all the original disciples of Jesus had died, except for three which he allowed to live indefinitely until the end of human history. New disciples are ordained to replace the ones that died, and "surely there could not be a happier people among all the people who had been created by the hand of God" (4 Nephi 1:16). During this time, the distinction between the Lamanites and Nephites disappears, and "neither were there Lamanites, nor any manner of -ites; but they were in one, the children of Christ, and heirs to the kingdom of God" (4 Nephi 1:17).

The Nephite who recorded the coming of Jesus to America dies, and the keeping of the plates passed to his son Amos. After that, the people begin to grow rich, wear expensive clothing and jewelry, and divide themselves into rich and poor, and the communal sharing of private property comes to an end. Then they form churches which are really businesses for the purpose of gaining profit.

One of these churches begins to persecute members of the True Church of Christ, locking them into prison (which subsequently breaks), throwing them into fiery furnaces (whereupon the victims walk out unscathed), or casting them into a lion's den (where the victims play with the lions as if they were lambs): "And they did smite upon the people of Jesus; but the people of Jesus did not smite again" (4 Nephi 1:34).

The people once again divide into Nephites and Lamanites, and although the Nephites remain righteous longer than the Lamanites, "both the people of Nephi and the Lamanites had become exceedingly wicked one like unto another" by 300 AD (4 Nephi 1:45).

The book concludes with Ammaron hiding the sacred records, which he ultimately delivers to the prophet Mormon, with the subsequent Book of Mormon detailing the decline of the Nephite civilization and their wars with the Lamanites.

Fourth Nephi Contribution of Mormon (Large Plates of Nephi)
Preceded by Third Nephi	Book of Mormon	Succeeded by Mormon
