= Third Nephi =

Book of the Book of Mormon

The Book of Nephi: The Son of Nephi, Who Was the Son of Helaman, usually referred to as Third Nephi or 3 Nephi (/ˈniːfaɪ/ NEE-fy), is a religious text of the Latter Day Saint movement which constitutes one of fifteen books that make up the Book of Mormon. This book was originally called "III Nephi" in the 1879 edition, and "Third Nephi" in the 1920 edition of the Book of Mormon. It contains an account of the visit of Jesus Christ to the inhabitants of ancient America. Jesus had told his disciples in Jerusalem according to the Bible in the Gospel of John, "And other sheep I have, which are not of this fold: them also I must bring, and they shall hear my voice; and there shall be one fold, and one shepherd." In this book, Christ declares to those in ancient America that they were these "other sheep" of whom he spoke. The account of this visit is recorded beginning in chapter 11 of 3 Nephi.

== Narrative of Christ's Visit ==
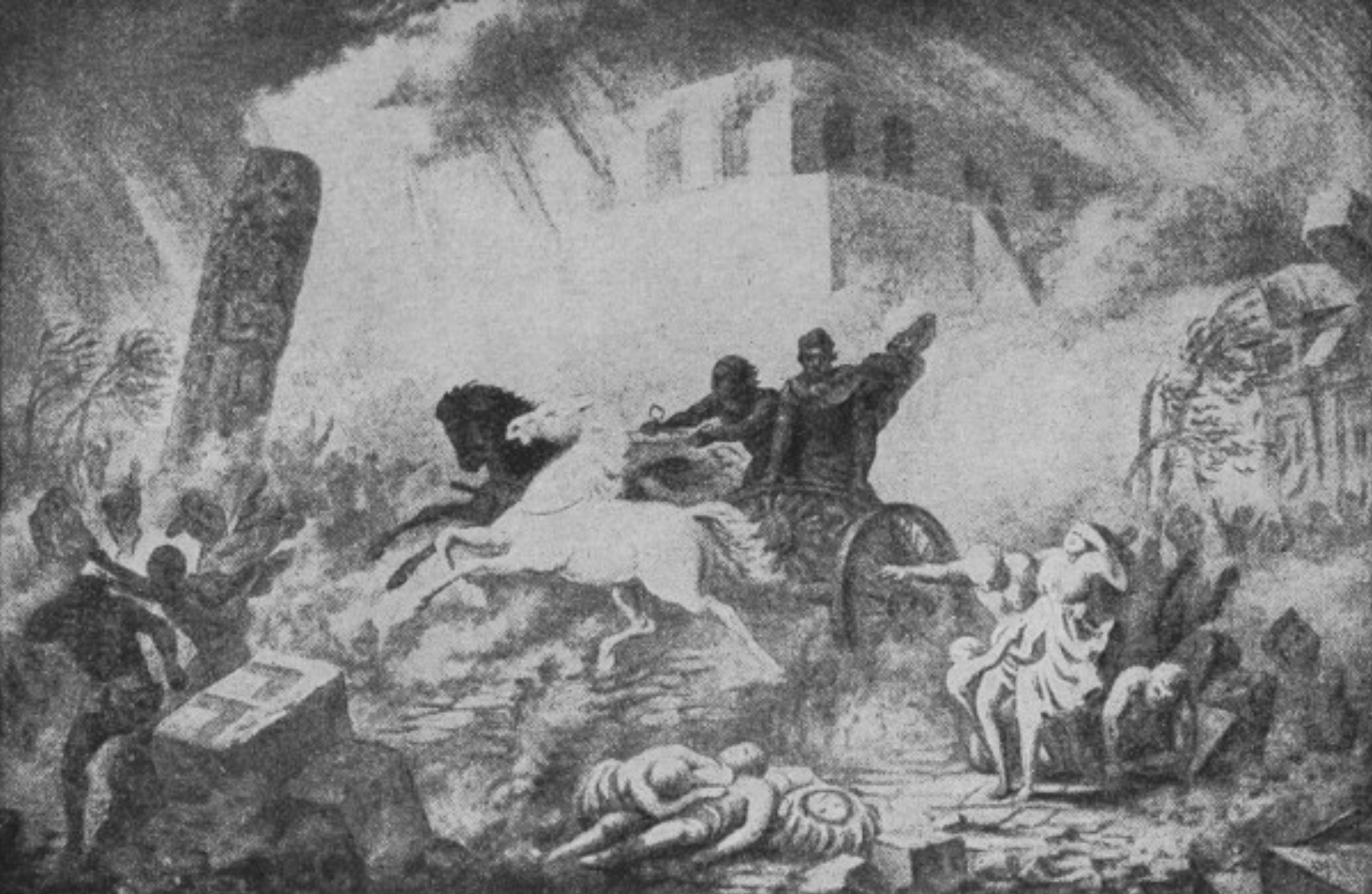
Destruction of Zarahemla by George M. Ottinger, published 1888

Before Christ visits these people there is a giant storm, a tremendous earthquake, and darkness. Cities burn, cities sink into the sea, mountains are brought down and valleys brought up. There is sharp lightning, wind, and thunderings and many people die. After the great storm comes darkness and the voices of mourning for the dead. The darkness lasts for approximately three days, during which a voice is "heard among all the inhabitants of the earth, upon all the face of this land, crying: Wo, wo, wo unto this people; wo unto the inhabitants of the whole earth except that they shall repent; for the devil laugheth, and his angels rejoice, because of the slain fair sons and daughters of my people; and it is because of their iniquities and abominations that they are fallen!" (3 Nephi 9:1-2) The voice then lists cities "and the inhabitants thereof" he had destroyed because of their wickedness: Zarahemla (3 Nephi 9:3), Moroni (9:4), Moronihah (9:5), Gilgal (9:6), Onihah, Mocum, and Jerusalem (the New World city founded by the Lamanites, Amelekites, and Amulonites, not Jerusalem in Judaea) (9:7), Gadiandi, Gadiomnah, Jacob, and Gimgimno (9:8), Jacobugath (9:9), Laman, Josh, Gad, and Kishkumen (9:10), since "there were none righteous among them" (9:11). He asks, "O all ye that are spared because you were more righteous than they, will ye not now return unto me, and repent of your sins, and be converted, that I may heal you?" (9:13) "Yea, verily, I say unto you, if ye shall come unto me, ye shall have eternal life. Behold, my arm of mercy is extended towards you, and whosoever will come, him will I receive, and blessed are those that come unto me." (9:14) "Behold, I am Jesus Christ, the Son of God. I created the heavens and the earth, and all things that in them are. I was with the Father from the beginning. I am in the Father, and the Father in me; and in me hath the Father glorified his name." (9:15)

After three days, the darkness clears. Jesus Christ is resurrected and the people gather to the land of Bountiful where stood a temple. A voice is heard from heaven which the people did not understand it at first, that "did pierce them that did hear to the center, insomuch that there was no part of their frame that it did not cause to quake; yea, it did pierce them to the very soul, and did cause their hearts to burn." The people do not understand the voice a second time but it understand it a third time. The voice is the voice of God Almighty, the very Eternal Father proclaiming His Son Jesus Christ the risen Lord.

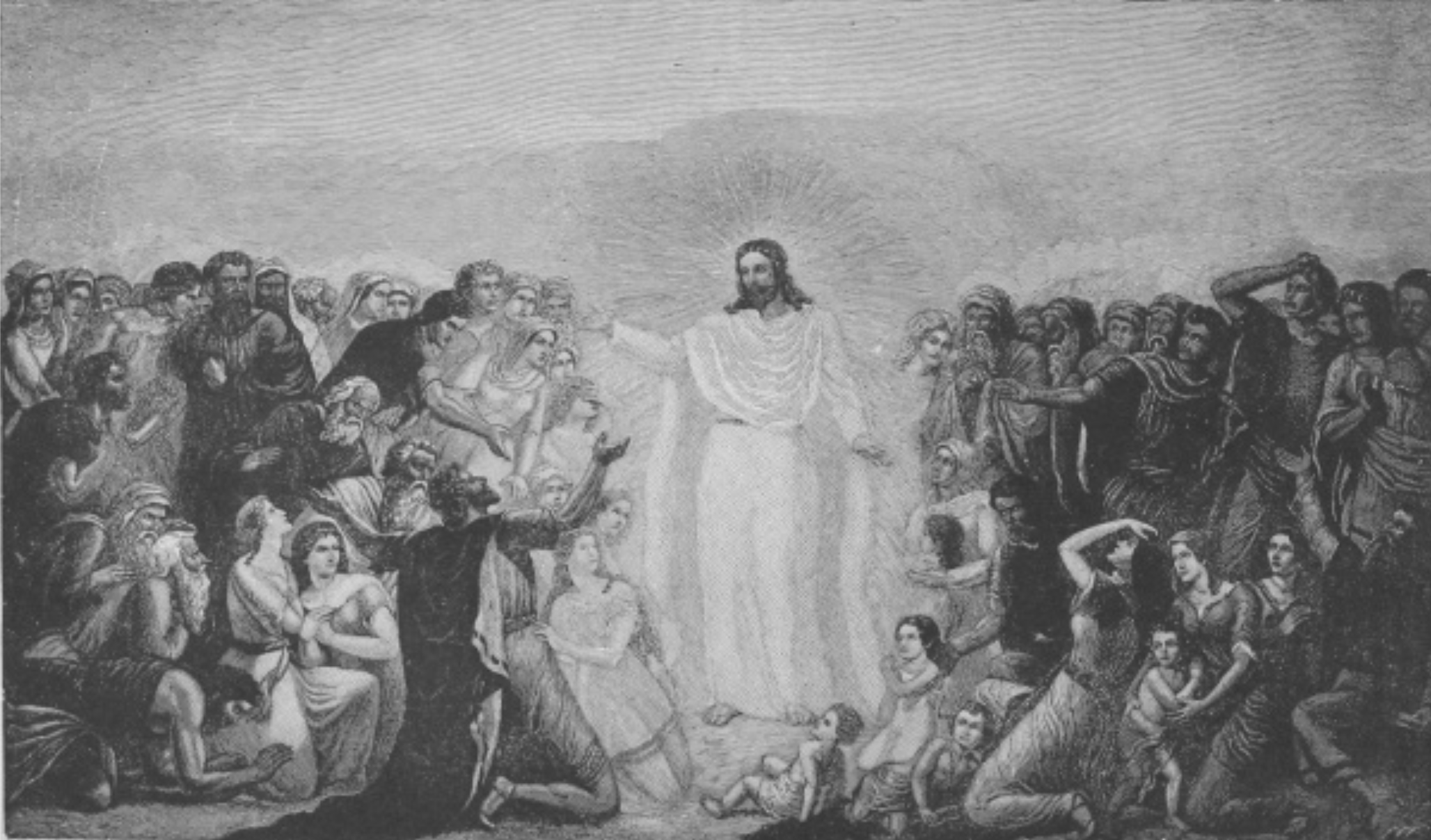
Artistic depiction of Jesus appearing to the Nephites, from the Logan Temple first published in 1880s

The resurrected Christ descends from the sky. He stands before them and calls them to come and sees the wounds in His hands and side. He heals them and teaches them precepts that were to guide their Church.

1. He gave to Nephi and others that he called the power to baptize the people, using the words: "Having authority given me of Jesus Christ, I baptize you in the name of the Father, and of the Son, and of the Holy Ghost. Amen." Then they were to be immersed in the water, and come out of the water again.
2. There were to be no disputes about his doctrine, because contention is Satanic.
3. Actions which stirred men to anger must be done away with. And Jesus said his doctrine came from the Father himself.
4. Repentance from sin must accompany baptism. Salvation depends on believing in Jesus and being baptized. Anyone who does not believe in Jesus and is not baptized will be damned.
5. Be reconciled with one's brother before asked to be reconciled with Christ.
6. Do not look on a woman with lust.
7. Do not divorce your wife except on grounds of unfaithfulness.
8. Do not swear oaths.
9. Resist evil.
10. When compelled to make a plaintiff whole in a civil suit, make more than full restitution.
11. When pressed into labor, do twice the work that is compelled.
12. Do not turn away anyone who asks to borrow.
13. Love your enemies.
14. Do not make a public display of alms-giving.
15. Do not make a public display of prayer or use vain repetition.
16. Do not visibly emphasize your misery when fasting.
17. Do not judge.
18. Ask God for all things through prayer with faith.
19. Do not follow after false prophets.
20. Jesus' words must be declared to the ends of the earth.
21. Ye shall call the church in my name. (3 Nephi 27:7)
22. Bring ye all the tithes into the storehouse, that there may be meat in my house (3 Nephi 24:10)
23. Never cease to pray in your hearts (3 Nephi 20:1)
24. Suffer not any one knowingly to partake of my flesh and blood unworthily (3 Nephi 18:28)
25. Ye shall meet together oft; and ye shall not forbid any man from coming unto you when ye shall meet together, but suffer them that they may come unto you and forbid them not (3 Nephi 18:22)
26. Always pray unto the Father in my name (3 Nephi 18:19)
27. Keep my commandments, which the Father hath commanded me that I should give unto you (3 Nephi 18:14)
28. There shall one be ordained among you, and to him will I give power that he shall break bread and bless it and give it unto the people of my church, unto all those who shall believe and be baptized in my name. And this shall ye always observe to do, even as I have done, even as I have broken bread and blessed it and given it unto you (3 Nephi 18:5-6)

== See also ==
- The Testaments of One Fold and One Shepherd
- Resurrection appearances of Jesus

Third Nephi Contribution of Mormon (Large Plates of Nephi)
Preceded by Helaman	Book of Mormon	Succeeded by Fourth Nephi
