= Moroni (prophet) =

Book of Mormon prophet

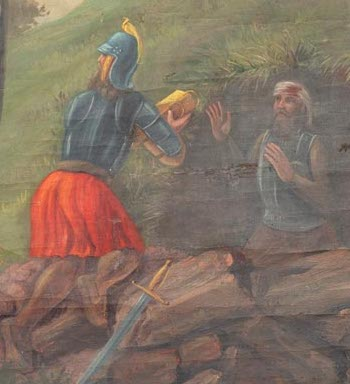
- Moroni Receives the Plates from Mormon, by C. C. A. Christensen (c. 1871–1875)

Personal life
- Parent: Mormon (father)
- Notable works: Mormon 8-9; Book of Moroni; Book of Mormon title page
- Occupation: Nephite military commander prophet record keeper
- Relatives: Mormon (father); Nephi (ancestor); Lehi (ancestor)

Moroni (/məˈroʊnaɪ/) is described in the Book of Mormon as the last Nephite prophet, historian, and military commander who, according to the faith of the Latter Day Saint movement, became the Angel Moroni who presented the golden plates to Joseph Smith.

== Synopsis ==
In the Book of Mormon, Moroni is the son of Mormon. Moroni shares a name with Captain Moroni, a much earlier Book of Mormon figure, of whom Mormon wrote highly.

Moroni works under his father, the commander in chief of a Nephite army, who battles against the Lamanites. Upon the Nephites' defeat at Cumorah, Moroni goes into hiding to avoid being killed by the Lamanites.

Instructed by his father to complete the Nephite record, which Mormon had abridged from previous records, Moroni narrates chapters 8 and 9 of Mormon's record in the larger Book of Mormon, the Book of Moroni, and the Book of Ether.

Upon completion of the record, Moroni buries the plates.

== Angel figure ==
In Latter Day Saint belief, Moroni was resurrected after his death and became an angel who directed Joseph Smith to the location of the buried golden plates in the 1820s.

== See also ==
- Moroni, Utah
