= Book of Mormon (Mormon's record) =

Book of the Book of Mormon

The Book of Mormon is a book, or subdivision, of the larger Book of Mormon consisting of nine chapters. According to the text, the first seven chapters were abridged by the prophet Mormon and the last two by his son Moroni.

The book thus explains the claimed provenance of the Book of Mormon as an ancient record, mostly of the Nephites, compiled by Mormon and Moroni on the golden plates.

== Synopsis ==
=== Early life ===
Ammaron comes to Mormon when he is ten years old, because Ammaron judges him to be a serious child who was very intelligent. He tells Mormon that when he will be 24 years old, he must to go to the land of Antum and to the hill Shim, where he can find all the plates which Ammaron buried. He is supposed to take only the plates of Nephi but leave the other plates in the ground. Then he is to keep a journal of the doings of his people on the plates of Nephi.

When Mormon is 11, his father Mormon takes him south to the land of Zarahemla. Mormon finds that land to be completely covered with buildings and people. He witnesses a war between the Nephites and Lamanites along the borders of Zarahemla. The Lamanites are beaten by a force of 30,000 Nephites, then they withdraw and there is peace for four years.

There is so much wickedness among the Nephites that Jesus Christ orders a recall of his three glorified disciples, and their work of miraculous healing comes to an end. But Mormon himself receives the Holy Spirit because of the soberness of his mind. He wants to become a preacher, but his mouth is stopped shut by God due to the wilful rebellion of the Nephites.

There are robbers among the Lamanites who roam the land, causing the Nephites to bury their worldly goods in the earth, but the land is cursed, and it will not securely hold their valuables.

=== Leader of the armies ===
When war comes again between the Nephites and Lamanites in AD 327, Mormon is appointed the leader of their armies because he is large in stature, despite being only 16 years old. But the Lamanite armies are so great that Mormon's armies will not fight, and they began a retreat toward the north.

There they take possession of the city of Angola and fortify it to defend against the Lamanites. But it is still not enough, and they are driven by their enemies out of the city and out of the land of David. Then Mormon's army comes to the land of Joshua and try to make a stand, with the western sea hard by. The Lamanite king Aaron comes against Mormon's 42,000 with 44,000 of his own men, and is defeated in battle. This occurs in AD 331.

Finally it dawns on the Nephites that they cannot keep their own property on account of the robbers and the cursed land, and there arises a great lamentation. Mormon hopes that they will now turn back to the Lord and receive his blessings again, but his hope is in vain, because they are not sorrowful for their sins, but sorrowful for their lost property.

The Nephites are pursued by the Lamanites to the land of Jashon before Mormon can get them to stop and make another stand. The city of Jashon, by coincidence, is near the place where Ammaron told Mormon to dig up the plates of Nephi, which Mormon promptly did. Fourteen years prior, Ammaron told Mormon to dig up only the plates of Nephi and update them with the current doings of the Nephites. But Mormon has seen nothing but wickedness and abominations around him all his life, so he makes an account of them on the plates of Nephi and they end up in the hill of Cumorah. But only a brief summary of their wickedness is recorded on the plates that Joseph Smith translated.

Mormon records that besides much theft there was murder and divine cursing in the land. The Nephites boast in their strength and make oaths. They fight without asking God for help. Mormon says they were doing abominations too, but we have no record of what that entailed.

The Nephites are again hunted until they come northward to the land of Shem and fortify the city there. Mormon inspires the people at last stand to boldly and fight for their wives and children and hearth and home. It seems to work, for they did not shrink back when the Lamanites attack Shem. Mormon's army of thirty thousand defeats a Lamanite army of fifty thousand. They chase after the Lamanites, beat them again, reclaim their homelands, get them divided, and cease fighting for ten years. (Mormon ch. 2.)

During those ten years, the Lord commands Mormon to preach repentance to his people. It's useless, however, and they remain wicked. At the end of the ten years (AD 360), the Lamanites attack again, and the Nephites defeat them—twice. The Nephites become arrogant with these victories and decide they will avenge their fallen people and destroy their enemies. As a result of this, Mormon washes his hands of the mantle of the Nephite armies, and distances himself from them, especially after the Lord tells him that if the Nephites do not repent, it is they who will be destroyed instead.

Mormon, when writing about this, adds that future generations are not immune from this same judgment. (Mormon ch. 3.)

=== Idle witness ===
In the year 363, the Nephites, without Mormon at their head, leave the land Desolation to attack the Lamanites. The Lamanites drive them back to Desolation, fight and defeat the Nephites again, and the Nephites retreat from Desolation to Teancum. Mormon explains to future readers that the Nephites would not have been defeated if they had not attacked the Lamanites.

The following year, it is the Lamanites that attack the Nephites and are defeated, causing the Nephites to boast again. War continues until the year 367, when the Nephites, in their anger at the Lamanites' act of sacrificing women and children prisoners, fight back and drive the Lamanites out, so that they don't fight the Nephites again until 375. But when that happens, the Lamanites use all their strength, so that the Nephites never win again–prompting Mormon to go to the hill Shim and secure the records. (Mormon ch. 4.)

== Citations ==
Book of Mormon (Mormon's record) Contribution of Mormon & Additions by Moroni
Preceded by Fourth Nephi	Book of Mormon	Succeeded by Ether
