= Mormon (prophet) =

Book of Mormon prophet

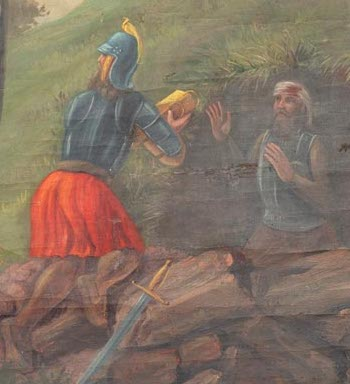
- Moroni Receives the Plates from Mormon, by C. C. A. Christensen (c. 1871–1875)

Personal life
- Children: Moroni (son)
- Parent: Mormon (father)
- Notable works: Plates of Mormon; Words of Mormon; Mormon 1–7; Moroni 8–9
- Relatives: Nephi (ancestor); Lehi (ancestor)

Mormon (/ˈmɔːrmən/) is believed by members of the Church of Jesus Christ of Latter-day Saints and the Community of Christ to be a prophet-historian and a member of a tribe of indigenous Americans known as the Nephites, one of the four groups (including the Lamanites, Jaredites, and Mulekites) described in the Book of Mormon as having settled in the ancient Americas.

According to the Book of Mormon, the prophet Mormon engraved an abridgement of his people's history on golden plates. Based on the chronology described in the book, Mormon lived during the 4th century AD. As a narrator in the text, Mormon presents himself as a redactor. He quotes and paraphrases other writers, collects and includes whole texts by other authors, contributes running commentary, and also writes his own narrative. He writes about the process of making the book, both in terms of compiling the works of other prophets and also in terms of engraving the words on metal plates. He alludes to content that is left out of the book, and refers to a larger collection of records at his disposal.

The Book of Mormon states that Mormon was instructed by the prophet Ammaron where to find the records that had been passed down from their ancestors. It also says that Mormon later abridged the near-millennium-long history of his ancestors, and added additional revelations into the Book of Mormon. Divisions of the book relating to Mormon's personal history are the Words of Mormon and the first seven chapters of the larger book. The book says that Mormon eventually passed all of the records on to his son Moroni.

== Life history ==
According to Mormon's record in the Book of Mormon, he was born to a father whose name was also Mormon, but was named "after the land of Mormon, the land in which Alma did establish the church among the people". At about the age of ten, he was visited by Ammaron and given instructions on where to find the sacred engravings of the Nephite prophets and what to engrave upon them. At the age of eleven, Mormon was taken to the land of Zarahemla by his father.

Mormon writes that at age fifteen he was visited by Jesus Christ.

In his "sixteenth year", being young but "large in stature", Mormon "was appointed by the people of Nephi" to be the leader of their armies, and fought against the Lamanites in many battles thereafter.

Mormon went to the hill Shim at about the age of 24, as instructed by Ammaron, to take and abridge the Nephite records.

Mormon writes that he "utterly refuse[d]...to be a commander and a leader" to the Nephites "because of their wickedness and abomination". However, about thirteen years later, Mormon decided to return as commander of the Nephite armies as they were being badly beaten by the Lamanites.

Upon returning, Mormon again led them in battle against the Lamanites until the entire destruction of the Nephite nation, which took place as a result of a huge battle fought between the two groups in 385. As the last prophet and keeper of the record, Moroni is said to have become the angel or messenger who revealed the location of the golden plates to Joseph Smith in 1823.

Mormon witnesses the destruction of the Nephite people and their armies as they battle against the Lamanites (Mormon 6:1). 15 years later (Mormon 8), Moroni finishes his father's record (Mormon 8:1) and mentions that his father was killed after the battle against the Lamanites at the Hill Cumorah (Mormon 8:3).

== Mormon as editor ==
The emphasis of several themes in Helaman leads some scholars to draw conclusions about Mormon. Mormon is the narrator the Book of Mormon presents as the final editor of the latter part of the Book of Mormon called the Plates of Nephi, which includes Helaman. In an article published by Brigham Young University (BYU)'s Religious Studies Center, Thomas W. Mackay, a professor of classical and medieval studies at BYU, outlines Mormon's philosophy of history. Mormon's editorial decisions reveal his attitudes about history, life, and theology. Mormon chooses to include incidents that fulfill earlier prophecies, indicating that he wishes to call attention to them. Additionally, Helaman 12 contains a long digression from Mormon where he explicitly states that people tend to become rebellious, causing God to respond with punishment until they repent. Lacking more information about Nephite and Lamanite history, readers are left to come to a similar conclusion as Mormon based on the evidence he presents. Mormon states that Satan influenced the Nephites to create secret combinations like the Gadianton robbers.

== Meaning of the name ==
Mormon scholar Hugh Nibley noted the prevalence of names in the Book of Mormon with the root "mor" and suggested that the root may be of Egyptian origin with the meaning of "beloved". However, in the 15 May 1843 issue of the Times and Seasons, Joseph Smith explained the name as being a contraction of the English word "more" and "mon", a word that Smith claimed was Egyptian for "good", making the name literally mean "more good".

== See also ==
- Book of Mormon prophets
- The Church of Jesus Christ of Latter-day Saints

== Works cited ==
- Mackay, Thomas W. (1992). "Mormon's Philosophy of History: Helaman 12 in the Perspective of Mormon's Editing Procedure". In Nyman, Monte S.; Tate, Charles D. (eds.). The Book of Mormon: Helaman Through 3 Nephi 8, According to Thy Word. Provo, UT: Religious Studies Center, Brigham Young University. ISBN 0-8849-4864-1.

Preceded by unknown during the early 300s; previously no one; eventually Gidgiddoni	Nephite military leader AD 327–362	Succeeded by unknown; eventually himself
Unknown	Nephite military leader c. AD 375–385	Extinct
Preceded by Ammaron	Nephite record keeper AD 345 – ?	Succeeded by Moroni
