= Mormon music =

Associated with the Church of Jesus Christ of Latter-day Saints

Music has had a long history in the Church of Jesus Christ of Latter-day Saints, from the days in Kirtland, Nauvoo, and the settlement of the West, to the present day. In the early days of the Church, stripped-down Latter-Day Saint folk music, which could be sung without accompaniment due to the lack of instruments in Utah, was popular. In the 19th century, the Mormon Tabernacle Choir was created and began touring, while musicians began writing devotional and praise music with a Latter-Day Saint influence, paralleling the success of Christian Contemporary Music. Several organizations have existed and do exist to promote these artists, such as Deseret Book and the now-defunct Faith-centered Music Association. Starting in the late 20th century and to the present day, Latter-Day Saints have been increasingly involved in modern popular music in America and elsewhere in the World.

== Mormon folk music ==
Mormon folk music constituted some of the earliest European-American music in the boundaries of modern Utah. These songs, simple and easy to remember, were usually sung without accompaniment because of the scarcity of musical instruments in territorial Utah. Although they often employed the same tunes as folk music elsewhere, Mormon folk music is distinctively Utahn. The songs often include unique pioneer-era Latter-Day Saint culture references to crossing the plains, LDS ecclesiastical leaders, and LDS religious convictions. Hymns and other folk music were used to lift the spirits of all the saints along their treacherous journey known as the Mormon Trail. They are still used as praises or prayers to their Heavenly Father as well as a way to welcome comfort, peace and guidance from the Holy Ghost whom they try to keep as a constant companion.

== Mormon Tabernacle Choir ==
Since 1847, the Latter-day Saint influence in Utah music is manifest in the state's most famous musical institution: The Mormon Tabernacle Choir. Named after the Salt Lake Tabernacle on Temple Square in Salt Lake City, Utah, the 300-member choir is world-famous. The LDS Church supports the choir both for prestige and as a proselytizing tool for spreading familiarity of the church but also to provide music at their biannual general conference. The choir performs at least weekly at the Tabernacle for a radio program called "Music and the Spoken Word" which is the longest-running national radio program in the US. The choir has released numerous albums since it first recorded in 1910.

== LDS-themed popular music ==
Beginning in the 1960s, gospel music gained some success, and Latter-Day Saints played an integral role in the development of Christian Contemporary Music (CCM) into the 1970s. The Latter-Day Saint concept album The Plan, by The Osmonds, was arguably the first explicitly Latter-Day Saint music recording to break into mainstream popularity in the rock era, with two tracks from the album reaching the U.S. top 40. Since then, Michael McLean from Heber, Utah and Kenneth Cope in Salt Lake City have become relatively popular among mostly-older Latter-day Saints for their religiously charged easy listening music. Music for LDS worship services is generally traditional with minimal accompaniment with piano or organ, so these musicians perform in venues other than in LDS worship services. In the 2010 and 2011, respectively, Jenny Oaks Baker and Hillary Weeks became popular contemporary Latter-Day Saint-themed inspirational recording artists.

Since 2005, the Nashville Tribute Band has produced country music with an LDS theme.

== Especially For Youth albums ==
Each year various artist from LDS Music are featured on an annual album called Especially for Youth (EFY), that is produced for a summer youth camp sponsored by Brigham Young University but are held at many universities across the United States. Several producers bid for the album on a 2-year cycle. The producer for the album is usually decided by EFY executive J.D. Hucks, a senior administrator for the Church Educational System's Youth & Family Programs.

In 2008, the EFY albums received criticism that over the previous decade they were "out of touch" with their targeted audience of youth ages 14–18.

Opponents of this idea find that though the albums might be youth-orientated and were created to be given to youth at EFY camp, they were also intended to be wonderful and uplifting - appropriate for any age. Many Saints enjoy the peaceful music with a modern twist in their homes daily as a way of inviting the Holy Ghost and making the day feel more reverent. Also, Deseret Book has written on their website that "Perhaps no other collection of albums has sold better to the youth over the last decade than the EFY albums released every summer." The EFY albums in the last 18 years are:

*Look Unto Christ in Every Thought (2025)
- Disciple of Christ (2024)
- I Can Do All Things Through Christ (2023)
- Wait On The Lord (2022)
- A Witness Of My Own (2021)
- Trust With All Thine Heart (2019)
- Choose Joy (2018)
- The Way To Become (2017)
- What Matters Most (2016)
- Here Am I (2015)
- Anxiously Engaged (2014)
- Firm In The Faith (2013)
- Arise and Shine Forth (2012)
- Believe. Hope. Endure (2011)
- The Courage to Stand Strong (2010)
- Be Thou an Example (2009)
- Steady and Sure (2008)
- Power in Purity (2007)
- The Greatest Gift (2006)
- A More Excellent Way (2005)
- Stand in the Light (2004)
- Look and Live (2003)
- We Believe (2002)
- Remember The Promise (2001)
- Forward with Faith (2000)

== Faith-centered Music Association ==
For a time, the Faith-centered Music Association rewarded excellence in music with the Pearl Awards given in a number of different categories.

Over its final few years the FCMA, which was run by senior management at Deseret Book, had been viewed as a way to "pat themselves on the back." Many if not all projects that were nominated and receive awards, are published by Deseret Book.

In 2010, the FCMA decided to take an indefinite hiatus from workshops and the Pearl Awards. In a letter to the general public, the FCMA stated that it had grown too large of an organization and tried to accommodate too many recommendations and criticisms to continue.

== In mainstream popular music ==
There are numerous artists active in the secular music world who are LDS, but do not write devotional or praise-style music. Prominent examples include Donny Osmond, Dan Reynolds and Wayne Sermon of Imagine Dragons; Lindsey Stirling, Alan Sparhawk and Mimi Parker of Low; Brandon Flowers of The Killers; Gladys Knight; Dallon Weekes of Panic! at the Disco and I Dont Know How but They Found Me; Dan Truman of Diamond Rio; Fictionist; SheDaisy; KASKADE; The Piano Guys; Amy Whitcomb; Jennifer Thomas (pianist); Dinah Jane Hansen of Fifth Harmony; and many past and present members of The Aquabats. There have been efforts to expand the umbrella of "Mormon Music" to encompass all Latter-day Saints who write or perform music, reflecting an increasing frustration with institutions like Deseret Book that confine their musical offerings to a very narrow view of what Mormon Music is. In particular, the blog Linescratchers has interviewed and compiled a list of many artists who fit this description.

=== Partial list of major label LDS artists ===
Individuals

- Alex Boyé (Shadow Mountain)
- Brandon Flowers (of The Killers) (Island Records) - Grammy nominated
- Dinah Jane Hansen (formerly of Fifth Harmony) (Jive Records)
- Gladys Knight (of Gladys Knight & the Pips) (Verve Records) - Kennedy Center Honors, 7x Grammy winner, Rock and Roll Hall of Fame inductee
- Donny Osmond (of The Osmonds) (Decca Records)
- Marie Osmond (Polydor Records) - Grammy nominated
- Nathan Pacheco (Disney Pearl)
- Ryan Raddon, aka DJ KASKADE (Warner Records) - Grammy nominated
- Dan Reynolds and Wayne Sermon (of Imagine Dragons) (Interscope Records) - Grammy winners
- Alex Sharpe (formerly of Celtic Woman) (Manhattan Records)
- Lindsey Stirling (BridgeTone)
- Dan Truman (of Diamond Rio) (Word Records) - Grammy winner

Groups

- Fictionist (formerly of Atlantic Records)
- Ryan Shupe & the RubberBand (formerly of Capitol Records)
- SheDaisy (Lyric Street Records) - Grammy nominated
- The Moth & The Flame (Elektra Records)
- The Osmonds (MGM Records) - Grammy Lifetime Achievement
- The Piano Guys (Sony Masterworks)

== See also ==
- Music of Utah
- Nauvoo Brass Band
- Rowan Taylor
