= Isaiah in the Book of Mormon =

One of the Nephite disciples in the Book of Mormon

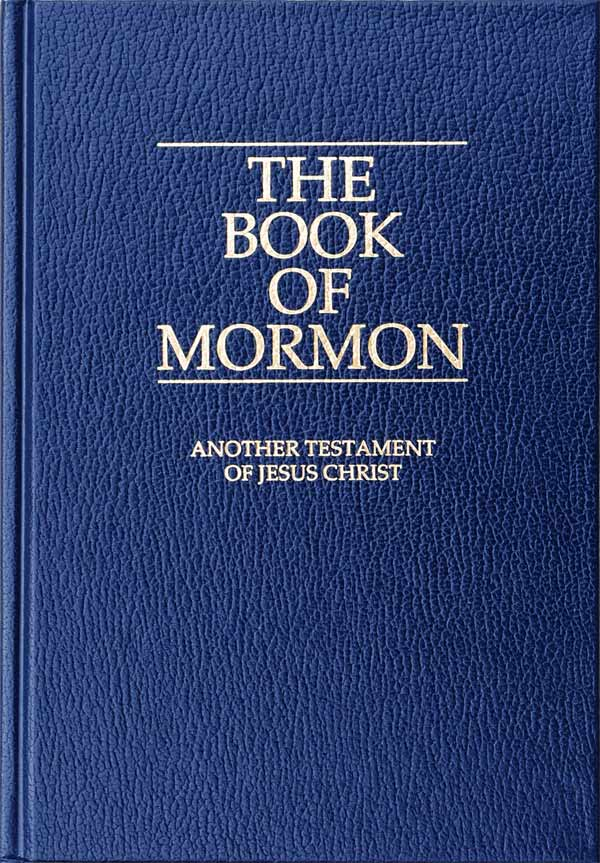
Book of Mormon, one of the Mormon scriptures, and also a source mentioning Isaiah

Isaiah (deseret: 𐐌𐐞𐐁𐐏𐐂) is described in the Book of Mormon, a sacred text of the Latter Day Saint movement, as a Nephite disciple called by Jesus Christ during his visit to the ancient Americas. According to the text, Isaiah was included early in the Nephite Quorum of the Twelve, taught a group of Nephites the sermon in the temple, was baptized by Nephi, confirmed, received the gift of the Holy Ghost, and underwent a transfiguration, presented as a sign of his ministry. The Book of Mormon states he began missionary work during Christ's visit and achieved significant success. The circumstances of his death are not specified in the text. In Latter Day Saint theology, Isaiah and his companions are discussed for their apostolic status, second baptism, and practice of praying directly to Christ. The name Isaiah appears in apologetic and critical works on the Book of Mormon and is used for children in Latter Day Saint families, particularly among Māori converts.

== Etymology and pronunciation ==
The name Isaiah, derived from the Hebrew yʿešaʿyāhû, which is variously translated as salvation of Yahweh, deliverance of the Lord, or the Lord/Yahweh is salvation, is included in the pronunciation guide of English editions of the Book of Mormon since 1981. According to Latter Day Saint sources, the modern pronunciation differs from that used during the early Utah Territory period, with the original pronunciation, attributed to Joseph Smith, holding significance in Book of Mormon studies but not in Mormon theology. The 1869 Book of Mormon edition in the Deseret alphabet is used to infer Smith's pronunciation.

The Book of Mormon states that the name Isaiah was known to the Nephites from the brass plates, a collection described as resembling the Old Testament but more extensive, written in Reformed Egyptian rather than Hebrew. These plates are said to include the Torah, Israelite history, Lehi's genealogy, prophecies, and parts of the Book of Jeremiah. According to Latter Day Saint belief, the brass plates and the golden plates, translated by Joseph Smith in what is termed Reformed Egyptian, provide the basis for the name's usage, though the exact Nephite pronunciation remains unknown.

Accounts from Smith's scribes, cited by Hugh Nibley, suggest he spelled out unfamiliar names during the Book of Mormon's translation rather than pronouncing them. In Latter Day Saint theology, the pronunciation of Nephite names, including Isaiah, is not doctrinally significant, as most were not transmitted orally to Smith, except possibly the name Moroni.

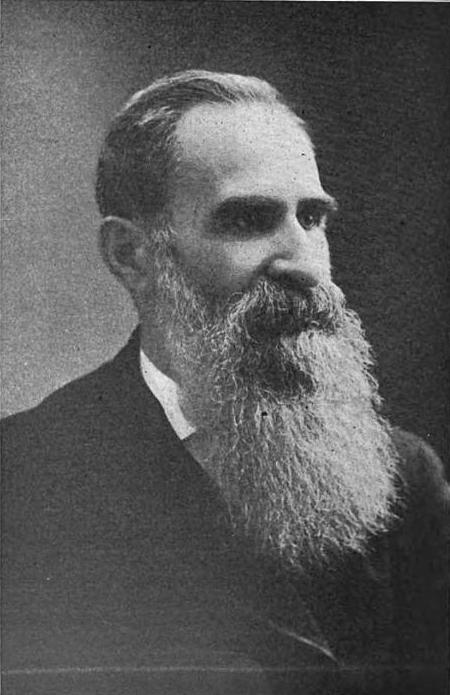
George Reynolds, one of the pioneers of the Book of Mormon research, in his work A Dictionary of the Book of Mormon, Comprising Its Biographical, Geographical and Other Proper Names, suggested that the results of the work of Isaiah and his companions were felt in both South and North America.

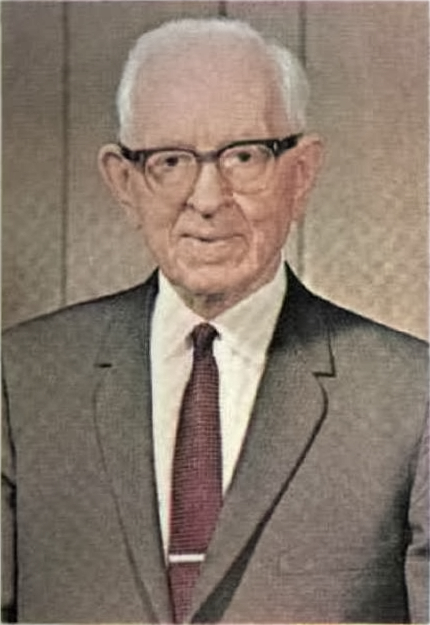
Joseph Fielding Smith, the 10th president of The Church of Jesus Christ of Latter Day Saints, analyzed certain doctrinal aspects of Isaiah's mission, including the issue of his apostolic status.

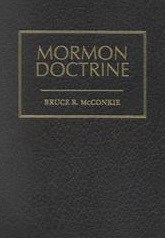
Cover of the second edition of Mormon Doctrine, a controversial work by Bruce R. McConkie. In this publication, the ministry of Isaiah is described as apostolic.

== References in the Book of Mormon ==
According to the Book of Mormon, the account of Isaiah is recorded in the larger plates of Nephi, part of the plates of Mormon, and summarized by the figure Mormon. The text, described as shortened and edited by Mormon without involvement from Moroni, appears in the 4th verse of the 19th chapter of the Third Book of Nephi in editions since 1981. The current chapter and verse system was established in 1879, differing from the 1830 first edition, where Isaiah's mention was in the 9th chapter of the same book. The passage naming Isaiah is estimated to have been translated on 16 May 1829.

The Book of Mormon also mentions Isaiah in other chapters of the Third Book of Nephi as one of the twelve Nephite disciples, in verses one to three of the second chapter of the Book of Moroni, and in early sections of the Fourth Book of Nephi.

== Visit of Christ to the Americas ==
According to the Book of Mormon, Isaiah was one of twelve Nephite disciples called by Jesus Christ during his visit to the ancient Americas, an event said to be foretold by prophets in the text approximately 600 years earlier. The text states that Isaiah's inclusion in the Nephite Quorum of the Twelve occurred early, possibly on the first day of Christ's visit, per LDS commentators.

The Book of Mormon describes Isaiah receiving the power to baptize and serving in the body presiding over the Church of Christ among the Nephites. It states he taught a group of Nephites the sermon in the temple, which commentators estimate occurred on the second day of Christ's ministry. The text recounts that Isaiah, baptized by Nephi (described by commentators as akin to a modern President of the Quorum of the Twelve), was confirmed, received the gift of the Holy Spirit, and was surrounded by "what seemed like fire" as angels ministered to him and his companions. The narrative compares this to a similar event involving Nephite children.

The Book of Mormon further describes Jesus ministering to Isaiah and the spiritually purified disciples, regarding them as friends and obedient servants, and commanding them to pray. It notes that Isaiah and his companions prayed directly to Jesus rather than the Father, justified by Christ's presence. They continued praying during Jesus' private prayer of thanksgiving, with commentators noting the influence of the Holy Spirit.

=== Theological interpretations ===
LDS commentators suggest that Isaiah and the disciples' desires during prayer aligned with the Father's will, as Mormon's redaction omits specific desires, indicating they possessed the mind of Christ. The Book of Mormon states that Isaiah and his companions experienced transfiguration, presented as a sign of their ministry, pleasing Jesus. Their prayer during Jesus' second private prayer is said to have brought him joy. The text describes them participating in the sacrament, receiving and distributing bread and wine to Nephites, possibly to about 2,500 people.

The Book of Mormon indicates that Isaiah and the disciples began baptizing and teaching while Christ was present, with each baptized individual promised the Holy Spirit through the laying on of hands. The text does not specify the duration between Christ's initial three-day visit and his next appearance, though their early activities are assumed to have occurred in Bountiful. The narrative states that Christ's subsequent appearance addressed the church's name, with the disciples inquiring about their future roles. The Book of Mormon emphasizes the disciples, including Isaiah, keeping accurate records, which commentators interpret as a responsibility for the righteousness of the Nephites, noting potential political implications of their question about the church's name.

=== Further ministry ===
According to the Book of Mormon, after Christ's ministry and ascension among the Nephites, Isaiah and the other disciples continued their work with great zeal, achieving significant success. In his 1891 work A Dictionary of the Book of Mormon, Comprising Its Biographical, Geographical and Other Proper Names, George Reynolds states that "in a short time, every soul on both [American] continents accepted the message they carried".

The Book of Mormon describes their ministry extending across Nephite-inhabited lands, with the Gospel being widely accepted. The Church of Jesus Christ of Latter-day Saints holds that these events occurred in the ancient Americas, without specifying further geographical details.

=== Death ===
The Book of Mormon does not specify the time of Isaiah's death. According to the text, Christ promised that the Nephite disciples would live to see their ministry fulfilled, with some LDS commentators suggesting the last disciple died between 79 and 100 CE.

The Book of Mormon states that three Nephite disciples were divinely "concealed from the world" and may have been transfigured to remain on earth until Christ's Second Coming, but it does not confirm whether Isaiah was among them. In LDS theology, such transfiguration is described as a change from telestial to terrestrial properties. Oliver B. Huntington, an early LDS member, noted in his 1895 journal that Isaiah was not among these disciples, though he provided no source for this claim.

According to an account by John Taylor, a close associate of Joseph Smith and third president of The Church of Jesus Christ of Latter-day Saints, Isaiah is believed to have taught Joseph Smith, aiding in his preparation for his role as the founder of the Latter Day Saint movement.

== In criticism of the Book of Mormon ==
Critics of the Book of Mormon and Mormonism have referenced Isaiah and other Nephite disciples in their analyses. Dan Vogel, in his naturalistic interpretation of the Book of Mormon's origins, contrasts the text's depiction of Isaiah's missionary success and the establishment of a theocratic government with the secular tendencies of President Andrew Jackson's era. He argues that choosing an Old Testament name like Isaiah was predictable and suggests that its absence in earlier lost portions of the Book of Mormon manuscript may indicate Joseph Smith spontaneously created the list of disciples.

== In Latter Day Saint theology ==
=== Question of apostleship ===
In the Book of Mormon, Isaiah and his companions are described as "disciples" rather than "apostles". However, in Latter Day Saint theology, Joseph Fielding Smith, the 10th president of The Church of Jesus Christ of Latter-day Saints, argued that they received the fullness of the Gospel and the Melchizedek priesthood, akin to the apostles in ancient Palestine, making them special witnesses of Jesus Christ among the Nephites. Smith further stated that the Nephite disciples were subject to the authority of Saint Peter, yet their doctrinal status was comparable to that of Joseph Smith and Oliver Cowdery in the "dispensation of the fulness of times". In his 1958 work Mormon Doctrine, Bruce R. McConkie, a member of the Quorum of the Twelve, similarly described their ministry as apostolic.

Sidney B. Sperry noted that, theologically, Christ's church has only one Quorum of the Twelve at a time, but the Nephite disciples, unknown to their Palestinian counterparts, had an equal right to an apostolic ministry, supported by Moroni 2:1–2 and Joseph Smith's 1842 statement on an American apostolate. George Q. Cannon, in an 1882 sermon as First Counselor in the First Presidency, stated that Peter held the keys of that dispensation, and the Nephite apostles were subject to the Jerusalem Twelve.

=== Issue of rebaptism ===
Latter Day Saint scholars have questioned why Isaiah and other Nephite disciples, already baptized, underwent a second baptism, as described in the Book of Mormon. Joseph Fielding Smith explained that this was due to the church's reorganization under a new Gospel dispensation, noting that Joseph Smith and early Latter Day Saints were similarly baptized again on 6 April 1830, the church's formal organization date.

=== Question of praying to Christ ===
In Latter Day Saint theology, the Book of Mormon's depiction of Isaiah and his companions praying directly to Jesus Christ, rather than the Father, is considered unique. Bruce R. McConkie explained that Christ's physical presence among them meant seeing and praying to him was equivalent to addressing the Father, though he noted this event was exceptional and unrepeatable.

== In Latter Day Saint culture ==
The Book of Mormon character Isaiah is featured in Latter Day Saint cultural works. He appears with other Nephite disciples in the fourth season of the Book of Mormon Videos series, produced by The Church of Jesus Christ of Latter-day Saints. He is also depicted in the church's Scripture Stories Coloring Book: Book of Mormon, a children's publication. The name Isaiah, rendered as Ihaia, is used among Māori members of the Latter Day Saint faith.

== Bibliography ==
- Largey, Dennis L., ed. (2003). The Book of Mormon Reference Companion. Salt Lake City: Deseret Book. ISBN 978-1-60908-763-0.
- Nyman, Monte S.; Tate, Charles D., eds. (1993). "The Twelve: A Light unto This People". The Book of Mormon: 3 Nephi 9–30, This Is My Gospel. Provo: Religious Studies Center. ISBN 0-8849-4913-3.
- Hyde, Paul Nolan (2015). A Comprehensive Commentary of the Book of 3 Nephi. Orem: Parrish Press.
- Gaskill, Alonzo L. (2015). Miracles of the Book of Mormon: A Guide to the Symbolic Messages. Springville: Cedar Fort Publishing & Media. ISBN 978-1-4621-1685-0.
