= Kumen (Latter Day Saints movement) =

One of the Nephite disciples in Mormon beliefs

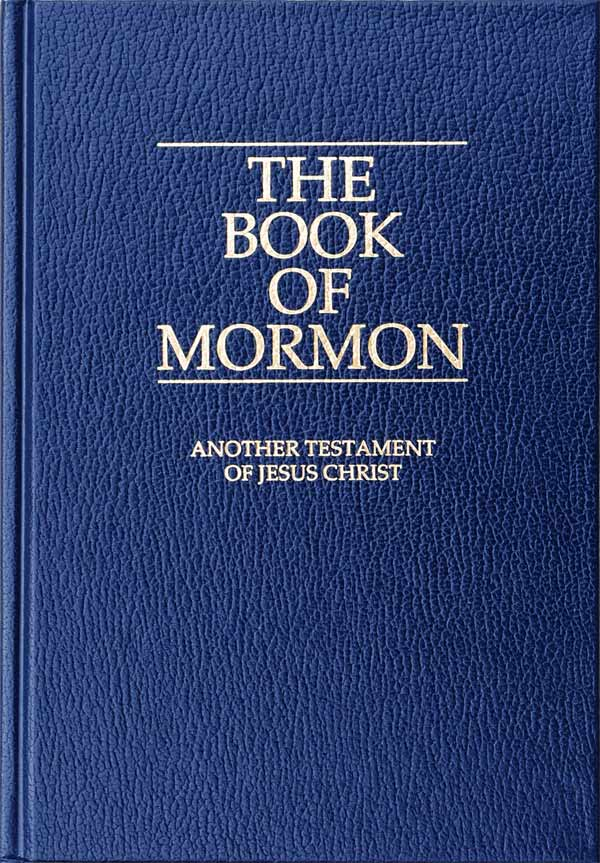
Book of Mormon, one of the sacred texts of Mormonism and the source of the reference to Kumen

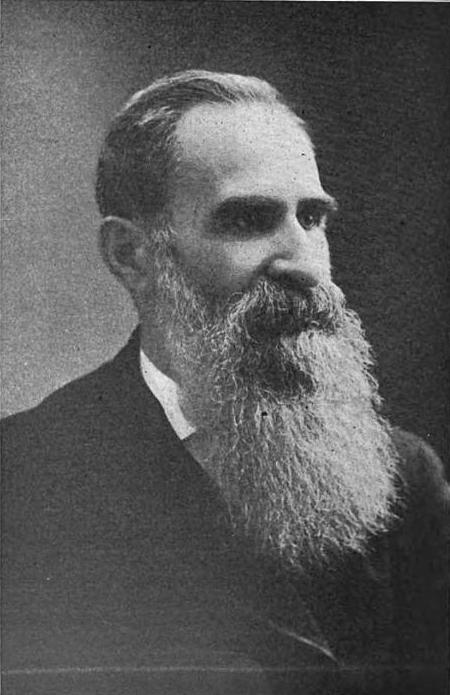
George Reynolds, one of the pioneers in the study of the Book of Mormon, suggested in his work A Dictionary of the Book of Mormon, Comprising Its Biographical, Geographical and Other Proper Names that the results of Kumen's work, along with that of his companions, were felt in both South and North America.

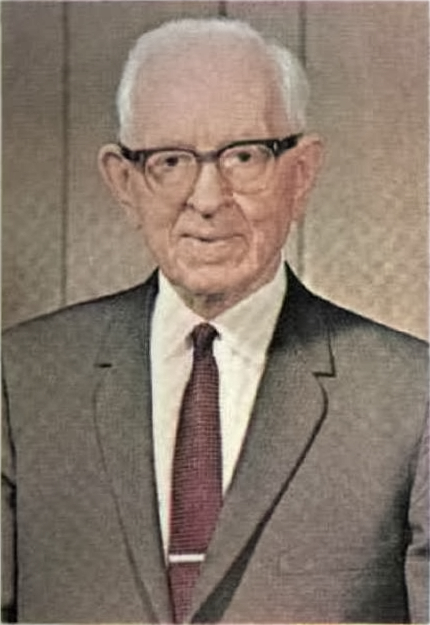
Joseph Fielding Smith, the 10th president of The Church of Jesus Christ of Latter-day Saints, analyzed certain doctrinal aspects of Kumen's mission, including the question of his apostolic status.

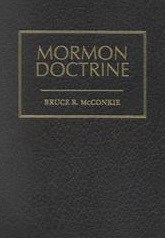
Cover of the second edition of Mormon Doctrine, a controversial work by Bruce R. McConkie. In this publication, Kumen's ministry was described as apostolic.

Kumen (Deseret: 𐐗𐐆𐐅𐐣𐐇𐐤), in the beliefs of the Latter Day Saint movement (Mormons), is one of the Nephite disciples (apostles) called by Jesus Christ during his visit to the ancient American continent. Kumen's inclusion in the Nephite Quorum of the Twelve occurred early. He taught a group of Nephites, delivering the content of what is known as the sermon at the temple. He was baptized by Nephi, confirmed, and received the gift of the Holy Spirit. He underwent transfiguration, which is considered a sign of the ministry to which he was called among the Nephites.

Kumen began his missionary work during Christ's presence on the American continent and achieved great success in his efforts. The circumstances of his death are uncertain. Along with his companions, he is a subject of discussion among Mormon theologians. His status as an apostle, his possible re-baptism, and the matter of direct prayer to Christ are topics of particular interest.

Kumen is often referenced by apologists of the Latter Day Saint tradition and appears in publications critical of the Book of Mormon. The name Kumen is also given to children in Latter Day Saint families among Māori adherents of Mormonism.

== Pronunciation of the name ==
The pronunciation of this name has drawn some interest from Mormon scholars. It was included in the pronunciation guide attached to every copy of the English version of the Book of Mormon since 1981. Nonetheless, sources indicate a significant difference between the pronunciation preferred and commonly used today and that of the early period of Utah's colonization. The original pronunciation, particularly that employed by Joseph Smith, holds some importance in the study of proper names found in the Book of Mormon, although, within Mormon theology, it is not considered a decisive factor. Determining Smith's pronunciation involves resources such as the 1869 edition of the Book of Mormon in the Deseret alphabet.

There are, however, accounts from individuals involved in the process referred to by Latter Day Saints as the translation of the Book of Mormon that shed light on how Smith initially handled unfamiliar words. Hugh Nibley, citing the testimonies of Smith's scribes, asserted that he never pronounced such words, always limiting himself to spelling them out. Within the framework of Mormon theology, there is no attempt to ascertain the original pronunciation of this particular name, nor are similar inquiries pursued regarding Nephite words and names as a whole.

Mormon theology also highlights the inherent challenges of pronouncing names and terms associated with this sacred Mormon text. This difficulty is attributed to the fact that none of these names were conveyed orally to Joseph Smith, perhaps with the exception of Moroni's name, as he introduced himself to Smith in a vision. From a doctrinal perspective, the manner in which the characters of the Book of Mormon pronounced these words remained unknown to the first Mormon leader.

== Placement in the text of the Book of Mormon ==
In a strictly theological sense, the account of Kumen is contained within the portion of material referred to as the Large Plates of Nephi. It is part of the Plates of Mormon, specifically the abridgment of the Large Plates of Nephi made by Mormon. It also remains within the portion of the text that was condensed and edited by Mormon, without the involvement of Moroni. In the official editions of the Book of Mormon, including the one in use since 1981, Kumen is mentioned directly only in the fourth verse of the 19th chapter of 3 Nephi. The modern system of division into chapters and verses dates back to 1879. In the first edition of the Book of Mormon, published in 1830, the mention of Kumen was part of the ninth chapter of the same book. It is estimated that the passage directly referring to this disciple was written on 16 May 1829.

Beyond the aforementioned direct reference, Kumen appears repeatedly in various other chapters of 3 Nephi, always as part of the Nephite Twelve. In a similar capacity, he is mentioned in verses one through three of the second chapter of the Book of Moroni, as well as in the opening sections of 4 Nephi.

== In events related to Christ's visit to the American continent ==
Kumen was among the twelve disciples called by Christ during his visit to the ancient American continent. His calling was said to have been foreseen by prophets mentioned in the Book of Mormon approximately 600 years earlier. The vast majority of information about him comes from records concerning all twelve Nephite disciples. Commentators have noted the likelihood that Kumen's inclusion in the Nephite Quorum of the Twelve occurred early, possibly on the first day of Jesus' visit.

He was given the authority to baptize and, as a member of the Twelve, was part of the body presiding over the Church of Christ among the Nephites. He shared with a group of his people the content of Christ's message, known in Mormon theology as the Sermon at the Temple. According to scholars, he could have taught around 2,500 people, including men, women, and children. It is speculated that these teachings lasted several hours and are chronologically placed in the morning hours of the second day of Jesus' ministry in the Americas.

He later prayed, along with his fellow disciples, for the gift of the Holy Spirit. Kumen was baptized by Nephi, a disciple described as fulfilling a role equivalent to the modern-day President of the Quorum of the Twelve. Although it is only speculative, this baptism might have taken place in the Sidon river. Subsequently, he was confirmed and received the aforementioned gift of the Holy Spirit. He and his companions were then surrounded by what seemed to be fire, and angels descended from heaven to minister to them. This spiritual experience made him as innocent in the eyes of God as the Nephite children who had undergone a similar experience shortly before.

Jesus himself descended from heaven among the spiritually cleansed disciples, including Kumen, and ministered to them, considering them friends and obedient servants. He instructed them to kneel and pray. During a subsequent prayer, Kumen and his apostolic companions addressed Jesus directly instead of the Father, which is uncommon in contemporary Latter Day Saint practice. This was justified by the personal presence of Christ during the prayer.

They continued to pray during Jesus' first private prayer of thanksgiving to the Father. Commentators noted the influence of the Holy Spirit on the hearts and minds of the Nephite Twelve, including Kumen, in this situation. Theologically, it is suggested that Mormon, in his final redaction, did not record the desires the Nephite disciples may have expressed at this moment, likely because their desires aligned with the will of the Father. The Nephite apostles learned and were strengthened through their prayers, aligning their minds and desires with Christ's.

Kumen and his companions experienced a transfiguration, a sign of the ministry to which they were called among the Nephites. Their transformation and prayerful focus pleased Jesus, who smiled at them. They became attuned to divine truths through their steadfast and fervent faith. They remained in fervent prayer during Jesus' second private prayer, united in intense devotion, which again visibly pleased Christ.

After completing their prayers, they participated in the sacrament, being the first to receive bread and wine as baptized members of the Church of Christ. They then helped distribute the bread and wine among the gathered Nephites. Kumen might have been responsible for the previously mentioned group of about 2,500 individuals, making the ordinance quite time-consuming.

The records, less detailed regarding the disciples in subsequent sections, indicate that they began baptizing and teaching during Christ's presence among the Nephites. Commentators note that each baptized individual had hands laid on their head with the promise of the gift of the Holy Spirit, contingent on their faithfulness. It is unclear how much time elapsed between the first three days of Jesus' visit and his next appearance. It is assumed that the initial area of activity for the Twelve was the city and land of Bountiful. It is also unknown how long their mission beyond the city lasted, though some time must have passed before the disciples reunited. Christ's next appearance, which occurred soon after, was dedicated to clarifying the proper name of the church. The disciples were also concerned about their future roles as servants of God.

Christ reiterated the necessity for the Nephite disciples, including Kumen, to maintain accurate records of their ministry. Commentators see this as a reflection of the disciples' responsibility for the righteousness of their Nephite brethren. They also note the potentially significant political consequences of the disciples' question regarding the proper name of the church.

== Further ministry ==
After Christ's Nephite ministry concluded and his final ascension into heaven, the disciples, including Kumen, continued their apostolic work with great zeal. They achieved remarkable success. Elder George Reynolds, in his 1891 publication A Dictionary of the Book of Mormon, Comprising Its Biographical, Geographical and Other Proper Names, refers to this period of activity by Kumen and his companions, noting that "in a short time, every soul on both [American] continents accepted the message they bore".

However, this statement should be contextualized within the church's contemporary doctrinal position. Regarding the events of the Book of Mormon, the church states only that they occurred in ancient Americas, without providing further specifics. Nevertheless, it is reasonable to assume that their ministry spanned all Nephite-inhabited territories, with the Gospel being swiftly and universally embraced within this imagined geographical context.

== Death ==
The exact date of Kumen's death remains uncertain. If it is assumed that the youngest of the disciples was 20 years old at the time of their calling, the latest possible date of his death would be 86 CE. This aligns with the promise of Christ recorded in the third verse of the 28th chapter of 3 Nephi. However, the text does not provide clear conclusions on this matter. Theologians have noted a reference indicating that the last of the disciples died between 79 and 100 CE.

It is unclear whether Kumen was among the three Nephite disciples whose identities were divinely hidden from the world. If he was indeed part of this group, his body would have been transfigured, receiving terrestrial properties instead of telestial ones, and he would remain on earth until Christ's Second Coming.

Although doctrinally unresolved, this ambiguity has not hindered the development of Latter Day Saint folklore regarding Kumen's potential inclusion among the three Nephite disciples. Oliver B. Huntington, an early church member, recorded in his journal on 16 February 1895 a list of the names of these disciples, which did not include Kumen. While Huntington's journal is known for theological revelations often attributed to the prophetic authority of Joseph Smith, he did not provide a source for this particular claim.

Regardless of whether Kumen was one of the three Nephite disciples, there is a tradition that he taught Joseph Smith. In this role, he is said to have helped prepare the founder of the Latter Day Saint movement for his divinely assigned mission. This information comes from the writings of John Taylor, a close associate of Smith and the third president of the church.

== In studies on the Book of Mormon ==
The existence of Kumen has not been corroborated by external sources. Linguists associated with The Church of Jesus Christ of Latter-day Saints have speculated about the etymology of this apostle's name, considering its potential origins in Semitic languages, while also entertaining the possibility of Egyptian derivation. Hugh Nibley suggested that the name has Hittite roots, preserved in a form exhibiting strong Egyptian influences. He noted that Hittite place names were common in Palestine during the time of Lehi, potentially entering the language used by the Nephites.

Nibley also pointed to the resemblance of Kumen's name to the Hittite city of Kumani, adding another dimension to its hypothesized origins.

== In criticism of the Book of Mormon ==
Kumen, along with other Nephite disciples, has been featured in critical analyses of the Book of Mormon and Mormonism as a whole. Dan Vogel incorporated Kumen into his naturalistic explanations of the origins of this sacred text. In his critique, Vogel contrasted the extraordinary success of Kumen's missionary work and the resulting establishment of a theocratic government with the more secular trends observed in President Andrew Jackson's era. Vogel also speculated that the absence of Kumen's name elsewhere in the text in reference to any other Nephite suggested that Joseph Smith spontaneously created the list of disciples.

== In Mormon theology ==
=== Question of apostleship ===
In the primary scriptural text, Kumen and his companions are referred to only as disciples, not apostles. However, Joseph Fielding Smith, an expert on Mormon doctrine and the 10th president of the church, noted that they received the fullness of the Gospel along with the authority and ordination of the Melchizedek Priesthood, just as the apostles called in ancient Palestine did. This endowed them with divine authority to act as special witnesses of Jesus Christ among their people. Thus, they can be regarded as apostles sent to the Nephites. In discussing their relationship to the apostles of the early church in Palestine, Smith asserted that the Nephites ultimately fell under the authority of Simon Peter. Nevertheless, their doctrinal status was equivalent to that granted to Joseph Smith and Oliver Cowdery during the dispensation of the fullness of times. Bruce R. McConkie, son-in-law of Smith and a member of the Quorum of the Twelve, referred to the Nephite disciples' ministry as apostolic in his controversial 1958 work Mormon Doctrine.

Sidney B. Sperry similarly emphasized that, while the Church of Christ can have only one Quorum of the Twelve at a given time, the Nephite disciples were unknown to their Palestinian counterparts. The inhabitants of the American continent had the same right to apostolic ministry as those in the Mediterranean region. According to Sperry, the apostolic status of the Nephite disciples is supported by the first and second verses of the second chapter of the Book of Moroni, as well as by a statement from Joseph Smith on 1 March 1842 regarding the presence of apostleship on the ancient American continent.

This topic is not new in Mormon thought. George Q. Cannon, one of the early Mormon leaders, elaborated on it in 1882 during his service as First Counselor in the First Presidency. In a sermon, Cannon stated that the keys were held by Peter as the head of that dispensation. Consequently, those who received apostleship on the American continent were subject to the judgment of the Twelve in Jerusalem.

=== Issue of re-baptism ===
Some scholars specializing in Mormon theology and the analysis of the Book of Mormon have pondered why Kumen and the other Nephite disciples needed to be re-baptized, even though it is evident that they had already undergone this ordinance. Joseph Fielding Smith commented on this matter, stating that the reason was the reorganization of the church under the dispensation of the Gospel. In this context, the church had previously existed in a legal sense. Smith linked these events described in the Book of Mormon to the early history of the Latter Day Saint movement. He observed that Joseph Smith and other early Mormons were also baptized twice, with the second baptism occurring on 6 April 1830, the formal organization date of the church.

=== Issue of praying to Christ ===
The prayer directed by Kumen and his companions directly to Jesus has also drawn interest from Mormon theologians, primarily because of its unusual nature in the context of Mormon culture. Bruce R. McConkie addressed this aspect of the narrative about Kumen. He explained that Jesus Christ, being physically present with them, represented the Father. Seeing him, therefore, was equivalent to seeing the Father. Praying to him was akin to praying to the Father. Nevertheless, McConkie acknowledged the exceptional and unique nature of this situation. He remarked that it occurred only this one time in all the long ages of the Lord's interactions with His children.

== In Mormon culture ==
Regardless of the surrounding etymological and theological speculations, Kumen has found a place in Mormon culture. Along with his companions, he appeared in the fourth season of the Book of Mormon Videos series, produced under the church's initiative. He was also depicted, together with his companions, in the Scripture Stories Coloring Book: Book of Mormon, a coloring book for children published by the church. The name Kumen (spelled Kumene) is also found among Māori adherents of Mormonism.

== Bibliography ==
- Woodger, Mary Jane (2000). "How the Guide to English Pronunciation of Book of Mormon Names Came About". Journal of Book of Mormon Studies. 9 (1). Brigham Young University. ISSN 2168-3158.
- Welch, John W. (2020). John W. Welch Notes - Come Follow Me. Springville, Utah: Book of Mormon Central.
- Nyman, Monte S.; Tate, Charles D., eds. (1993). The Book of Mormon: 3 Nephi 9–30, This Is My Gospel. Provo: Religious Studies Center. ISBN 0-8849-4913-3.
- Hyde, Paul Nolan (2015). A Comprehensive Commentary of the Book of 3 Nephi. Orem: Parrish Press.
- Gaskill, Alonzo L. (2015). Miracles of the Book of Mormon: A Guide to the Symbolic Messages. Springville: Cedar Fort Publishing & Media. ISBN 978-1-4621-1685-0.
