= The Great Apostasy (book) =

1909 book by James E. Talmage

The Great Apostasy Considered in the Light of Scriptural and Secular History
- Title page for The Great Apostasy Considered in the Light of Scriptural and Secular History (1909)
- Author: James E. Talmage
- Language: English
- Publisher: Deseret News
- Publication date: 1909
- Publication place: United States
- Pages: 176

The Great Apostasy Considered in the Light of Scriptural and Secular History is a 1909 book by James E. Talmage that summarizes the Great Apostasy from the viewpoint of the Church of Jesus Christ of Latter-day Saints (LDS Church).

Talmage wrote his book with the intention that it be used as a teaching tool within the LDS Church's Young Men's Mutual Improvement Association and the Young Women's Mutual Improvement Association. The book is "in many ways quite derivative" of B. H. Roberts's 1893 Outlines of Ecclesiastical History. Both writers borrowed heavily from the writings of Protestant scholars who argued that Roman Catholicism had apostatized from true Christianity. Talmage's book has been described as "the most recognizable and noted work on the topic" of Latter-day Saint views of the Great Apostasy.

The Great Apostasy has gone through many editions and continues to be published by Deseret Book, a publishing company owned by the LDS Church, and "is regularly referenced today" within the LDS Church. Along with Talmage's other classic works Jesus the Christ and Articles of Faith, The Great Apostasy has been of the few non-scriptural books that full-time LDS Church missionaries are encouraged to study. However, it is no longer part of the "approved missionary library."
