= Deseret Book Company =

American publishing company

- Parent company: Deseret Management Corporation (The Church of Jesus Christ of Latter-day Saints)
- Status: Active
- Founded: 1866
- Founder: George Q. Cannon
- Country of origin: United States
- Headquarters location: Salt Lake City, Utah, U.S.
- Key people: Sheri L. Dew, CEO; Laurel C. Day, President
- Publication types: Books, art, teaching aids
- Nonfiction topics: Mormonism "Values-based" subjects
- Imprints: Deseret Book; Bookcraft; Eagle Gate; Shadow Mountain; Covenant Communications
- Number of locations: 38 stores (2026)
- No. of employees: 150 (headquarters); 800–900 (overall)
- Official website: DeseretBook.com

Deseret Book (/ˌdɛzəˈrɛt/) is an American publishing company headquartered in Salt Lake City, Utah, that also operates a chain of 38 bookstores throughout the United States which includes: Arizona, California, Colorado, Idaho, Nevada, Oregon, South Carolina, Texas, Utah, Washington. It is a wholly owned subsidiary of Deseret Management Corporation (DMC), the holding company for business firms owned by the Church of Jesus Christ of Latter-day Saints (LDS Church). Deseret Book is a for-profit corporation registered in Utah. Deseret Book publishes under four imprints with media ranging from works explaining Latter-day Saint theology and doctrine, fiction, electronic resources, and sound recordings such, as The Tabernacle Choir at Temple Square albums.

== History ==
Deseret Book logo (1980–2010)

The Deseret Book Company was created in 1919 from a merger of the Deseret News Bookstore and the Deseret Sunday School Union Bookstore. Both of these Utah bookstores trace their roots to George Q. Cannon, an LDS Church general authority. "Deseret" is a word from the Book of Mormon that is said to mean "honeybee."

=== George Q. Cannon & Sons ===
Some books distributed by Cannon & Sons:
- Editions of the Book of Mormon and Pearl of Great Price.
- Several books by Charles W. Penrose.
- The Life of Joseph Smith (1888), George Q. Cannon.
- The Life of John Taylor (1892) and Outlines of Ecclesiastical History (1893), B. H. Roberts.
- Poems, Eliza R. Snow.
- Articles of Faith (1899), James E. Talmage
- The Senator from Utah (1895), Josephine Spencer

George Q. Cannon published the first issue of Juvenile Instructor magazine in 1866. Cannon organized the Deseret Sunday School Union, an LDS Church organization responsible for educating young church members, and the magazine was the first church periodical oriented toward youth. Cannon opened the George Q. Cannon & Sons bookstore in 1867 to sell the magazine and other publications of an uplifting nature. Cannon believed that secular novels did not reflect Latter-day Saint values. In the 1880s, Cannon expanded with a branch in Ogden, Utah.

It is not known how many books Cannon & Sons actually published itself. In that era, authors commonly self-published their books, which were then distributed by others. However, Cannon & Sons distributed several important books through their stores and mail order (see table).

The company had extensive ties to the LDS Church-owned newspaper, the Deseret News. Five of Cannon's sons held important positions in the paper, and Cannon himself was editor between 1867 and 1872, and again while temporarily owning the paper from 1892 to 1898. Nearly every George Q. Cannon & Sons book was printed on the Deseret News press. Cannon sold the bookstore to the LDS Church in 1900, near the end of his life. The church combined the two businesses, and the remaining Salt Lake City bookstore became Deseret News Bookstore.

=== Deseret News Bookstore ===
Notable books distributed by the Deseret News Bookstore:
- The House of the Lord (1912), The Great Apostasy (1909), and Jesus the Christ (1915), James E. Talmage.
- The Rise and Fall of Nauvoo (1900) and Mormon Doctrine of Deity (1903), B. H. Roberts
- Ancient Apostles (1918), David O. McKay
- Gospel Doctrine: Sermons and writings of President Joseph F. Smith (1919)

By 1906, Deseret News press had a Linotype machine and dedicated book press. Many significant volumes were published and distributed through the Deseret News Bookstore. Of these, the most successful was James E. Talmage's Jesus the Christ. Published in 1915, the book quickly went through numerous printings as the LDS Church's First Presidency authorized its use in its Sunday School program.

Meanwhile, the Deseret Sunday School Union, still publishing the money-losing Juvenile Instructor, struggled to maintain its distribution center, the Deseret Sunday School Union Bookstore. Aimed at church supply, the bookstore sold textbooks, minutes ledgers, and sacrament trays, as well as popular books. Beginning in 1891, the non-profit Union asked for yearly five-cent contributions from Sunday school pupils on "Nickel Sunday." Facing over $12,000 in debt in 1914, donations requested increased to ten cents, and 1919 a committee formed to study the organizations solvency. Led by Talmage, the committee recommended consolidation of the Sunday School Bookstore with the Deseret News Bookstore.

=== Deseret Book ===
Notable books distributed and/or published by Deseret Book:
- History of the Church, Joseph Smith and B. H. Roberts (ed.)
- Comprehensive History of The Church of Jesus Christ of Latter-day Saints (1930), B. H. Roberts
- What of the Mormons? (1947), Gordon B. Hinckley
- On the Way to Immortality and Eternal Life (1950), J. Reuben Clark
- A Marvelous Work and Wonder (1950), LeGrand Richards
- An Approach to the Book of Mormon (1957), Hugh Nibley, used as a Priesthood lesson manual
- Answers to Gospel Questions (1960, five volumes), Joseph Fielding Smith
- Meet the Mormons (1966), full-color Doyle and Randal Green book for non-Mormons
- A More Excellent Way (1967), Neal A. Maxwell
- Letters of Brigham Young to his Sons (1974), Dean C. Jessee
- The Story of the Latter-day Saints (1976), James B. Allen and Glen M. Leonard
- Building the City of God (1977), Leonard J. Arrington
- Marriott (1977), a book on John Willard Marriott by Robert O'Brien, former editor of Reader's Digest
- Charly (1980), Jack Weyland
- Spiritual Roots of Human Relations (1970), Stephen Covey
- The Promised Messiah (1978), one of a series of "Messiah" books by Bruce R. McConkie
- Coordinated new Latter-day Saint-specific editions of the King James Bible (1979) and Book of Mormon/"Triple combination" (1981)
- Jesus Christ and the World of the New Testament, Richard Holzapfel

By 1920, both antecedent bookstores were closed and a single new Deseret Book Company building was constructed in downtown Salt Lake City at site of the future, now demolished, ZCMI Center Mall. Ownership of Deseret Book was split between the Deseret News (70%) and the Deseret Sunday School Union (30%). However, the Union would manage the bookstore until 1932 when Deseret Book was incorporated for-profit as the "Utah Company". The Deseret News bought out the Sunday School Union in 1948 to become sole owner of the bookstore, but both the Deseret News and Deseret Book are now subsidiaries of DMC, which manages for-profit assets of the LDS Church. Deseret News Press printed nearly all Deseret Book publications until the 1960s when the company began seeking other competitive bids.

Through the 1930s, the bookstore focused mostly on Sunday school needs such as lesson manuals. Though the bookstore introduced relatively few new authors, several important works were published in this period. Notably, B. H. Roberts' magnum opus, the six-volume Comprehensive History of the Church of Jesus Christ of Latter-day Saints, 1930. Deseret Book did not accept manuscripts for publication until the 1940s when the company made a push for new authors.

Deseret Book expanded into motion picture equipment and photographic supplies in the 1940s. Winning an exclusive contract to distribute for Bell & Howell in Utah and parts of Idaho and Wyoming, Deseret Book supplied 16 mm film projectors to the LDS Church. Becoming a film distribution and rental outfit, the Deseret Book "Censorship Committee on Films" was established in 1946 because regular employees were unable to review all the films it handled. By 1950, 18 members sat on the committee.

Preceding modern Latter-day Saint cinema by over 50 years, Deseret Book founded Deseret Film Productions in 1947. The first film, produced by Frank Wise, was Where the Saints have Trod, an 80-minute film celebrating the 100-year anniversary of Mormon pioneers entering the Salt Lake Valley. Wise subsequently produced Temple Square, a 30-minute filmed tour of Salt Lake City's most popular tourist location. Deseret Film recorded over 120 general conference talks over a six-year period. Intended for rental to wards, the conference talks are the first motion pictures of the church's conferences.

In the 1950s, Brigham Young University (BYU) established a motion picture department which attracted Frank Wise. Deseret Film Productions was gradually disbanded. Soon, KSL-TV began covering general conferences.

Deseret Book's downtown location remained the only store until 1959 when site for an Ogden, Utah branch was donated. Stores in Orange, California and Salt Lake County opened in malls in 1962. In the 1970s, the original location was torn down to make way for the ZCMI Center Mall where the store reopened on April 2, 1976, during a general conference to attract large crowds. Several more mall locations opened in the 1970s; in Northridge, California, Boise, Idaho, and many more locations in Utah. In 1997, Deseret Book opened its first Washington state location in the city of Bellevue. By 2004, Deseret Book operated over 33 stores in 9 western US states. Expanding its reach in eastern Idaho, the chain also purchased Beehive Book Stores, located in Rexburg, Idaho Falls, and Blackfoot, Idaho. Deseret Book already operated in Idaho Falls at the Grand Teton Mall and in Rexburg. The new store in Rexburg has expanded merchandise selection from the prior two stores.

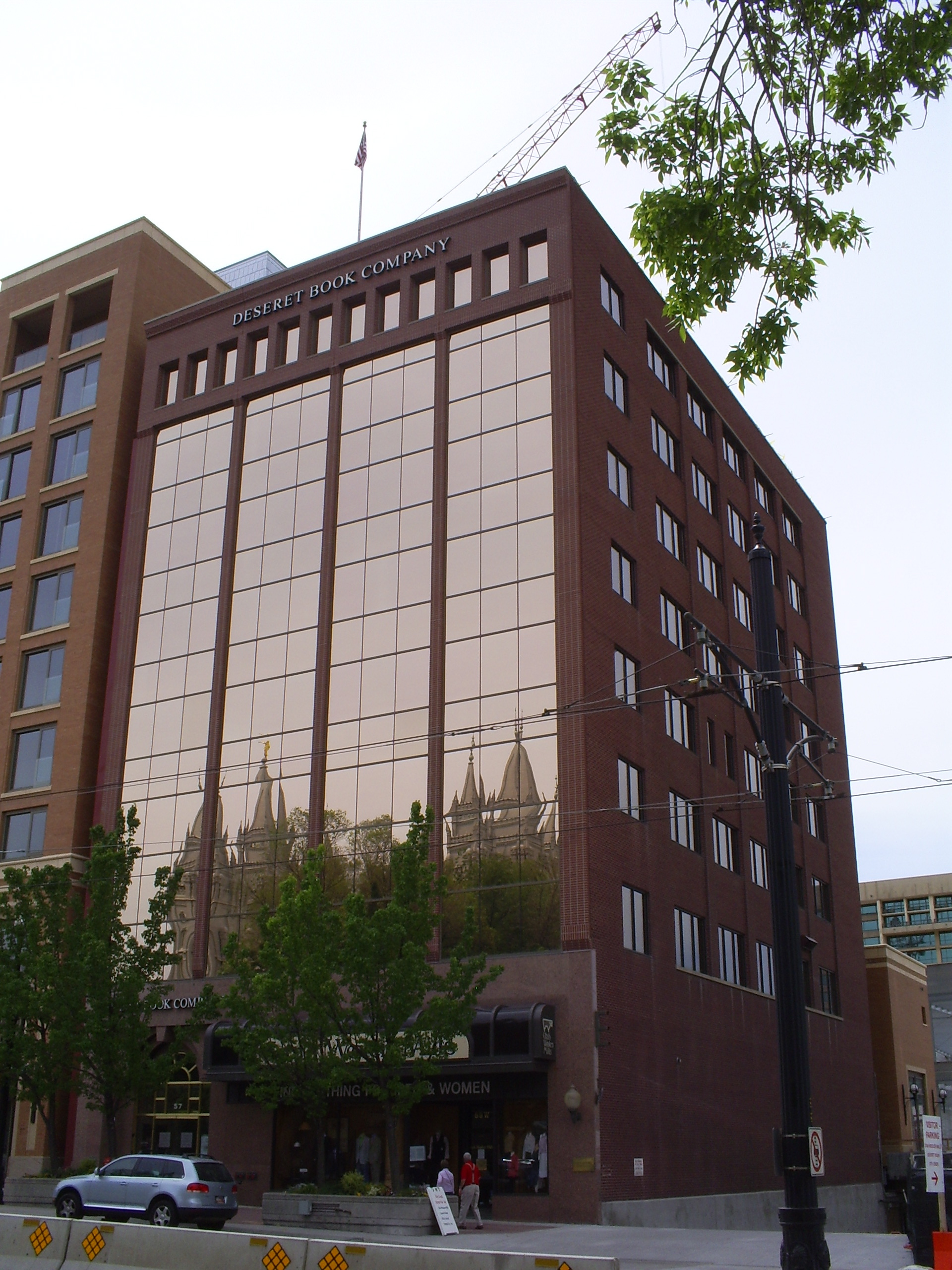
Deseret Book headquarters (2010)

In the late 1970s, Deseret Book coordinated publication of new editions of the King James Version of the Bible and the Book of Mormon/Doctrine and Covenants/Pearl of Great Price "Triple combination". The 1979 publication of the Bible was the first geared toward Latter-day Saints. A comparably styled "triple combination" was introduced in 1981. With notes from the Joseph Smith Translation, Talmage's scripture commentary, and an index and "topical guide", the new editions are now standard in the LDS Church. Typesetting for the volumes was done by Cambridge University Press.

Deseret Book began publishing Latter-day Saint fiction for the first time in 1979. In 1986, it purchased Mormon Handicraft–a handmade crafts store–from the Relief Society. As inventory and distribution was centralized in 1984, Deseret Book expanded its lines to include items such as CTR rings and more popular music.

In 2002, Sheri L. Dew became the first female CEO and president of Deseret Book.

Deseret Book established new corporate offices and downtown Salt Lake City retail space during the redevelopment of the Crossroads Plaza Mall into City Creek Center. In 2007, the corporate headquarters, with around 160 employees, moved into the top seven floors of the Utah Woolen Mills Clothiers building across the street from Temple Square. In April 2010 Deseret Book opened its "Flagship" store in the City Creek Center. This new store sits almost exactly on the same location as the first Deseret Book Location.

== Acquisitions ==
=== Bookcraft ===
In early 1999, Bookcraft was acquired by Deseret Book. This allowed them to expand in the larger "values-oriented" publishing market. The merger also brought more writings by general authorities under the church's ownership, allowing for electronic and print collaborations with other DMC entities (the Deseret News, and Bonneville International) and church entities (such as BYU and the Church Educational System).

=== Excel Entertainment Group ===
On November 15, 2004, Deseret Book announced that it had acquired Excel Entertainment Group, a 10-year-old company based in Salt Lake City which was known for its Latter-day Saint cinema productions as well as its record labels, including Highway Records, Joyspring Records, and Embryo Records (later renamed to Lumen Records). Jeff Simpson, the founder and president of Excel, became the new executive vice president of the merged company. Both companies are privately held, so terms of the deal were not publicly released. Although some Excel employees were relocated to Shadow Mountain music at Deseret Book headquarters, most remained at the separate Excel headquarters in Salt Lake City.

==== List of feature releases ====
- God's Army (2000)
- Brigham City (2001)
- The Other Side of Heaven (2001)
- Charly (2002)
- Pride and Prejudice: A Latter-Day Comedy (2003)
- Saints and Soldiers (2003)
- The Work and The Glory (2004)
- American Mormon (2005)
- The Work and The Glory II: American Zion (2005)
- Down and Derby (2005)
- The Work and The Glory III: A House Divided (2006)
- Outlaw Trail: The Treasure of Butch Cassidy (2006)
- Stalking Santa (2006)
- American Mormon in Europe (2006)
- Return with Honor: A Missionary Homecoming (2007)
- Anxiously Engaged: A Piccadilly Romance (2008)
- Only a Stonecutter (2008)
- Forever Strong (2008)
- The Errand of Angels (2008)
- Scout Camp (2009)
- Unitards (2010)
- Midway to Heaven (2011)
- Boys of Bonneville (2011)
- 17 Miracles (2011)
- The Making of Jimmer: The Story of Jimmer Fredette's Journey from the Playground to the Pros (2012)
- Saints and Soldiers: Airborne Creed (2012)
- Ephraim's Rescue (2013)
- Us and Them (2013)
- Saints and Soldiers: The Void (2014)
- Meet the Mormons (2014)
- The Christmas Dragon (2014)
- Once I Was a Beehive (2015)
- Freetown (2015)
- The Cokeville Miracle (2015)
- Just Let Go (2015)
- The Last Descent (2016)
- Love, Kennedy (2017)
- Trek: The Movie (2018)
- Jane and Emma (2018)
- The Other Side of Heaven 2: Fire of Faith (2019)
- The Santa Box (2020)
- Once I Was Engaged (2021)

==== Subsidiaries ====
- Lumen Records (formerly Embryo Records)
- Joyspring Records
- Highway Records (formerly Lightwave Records)
- Little Stream Records
- Excel Motion Picture Distribution
- Excel Retail Distribution

=== Seagull Book and Covenant Communications ===
Seagull Book logo

Covenant Communications logo

In July 2006, Deseret Book threatened to discontinue sales with another Latter-day Saint bookstore chain, Seagull Book & Tape, citing marketing differences. Seagull claimed that their discounted prices on Deseret Book's products was the reason for the threat. Seagull Book & Tape competed with Deseret Book's retail operation, but depended on the company's published work, which reportedly accounted for most of its sales. Deseret Book later opted to renegotiate its distribution contract with Seagull. On December 28, 2006, it was announced that Deseret Book was buying both Seagull Book & Tape and the publisher Covenant Communications, from Lewis Kofford. Company officials said they intended to continue running all three businesses as separate entities.

In April 2025, Deseret Book announced it would close all Seagull Book stores by the end of 2025 and make Covenant a Deseret Book brand.

== Deseret Book imprints ==
After Deseret Book acquired Bookcraft in 1999, it divided its publishing into four differently marketed imprints: Deseret Book for history and doctrine; Bookcraft for self-help, family, children, women's interests, and Latter-day Saint fiction; Eagle Gate for art, niche markets, library editions, and teaching aides; and Shadow Mountain for "values-based" publications for a national audience. A decade later, the only imprints that remained in use were Deseret Book and Shadow Mountain. In 2012, the Ensign Peak imprint was created for Latter-day Saint religious writings for a national audience.

After acquiring Covenant Communications in 2006, Deseret Book Company did not make it an additional imprint, but continued its independent operations as a publisher alongside Deseret Book Publishing.

== Shadow Mountain Records ==
The Shadow Mountain Records label, owned by Deseret Books, releases music aimed at Latter-day Saint audiences and reflecting Latter-day Saint themes. Releases by Shadow Mountain Records have ranked in top spots on the Billboard charts, including violinist Jenny Oaks Baker, and pianist Josh Wright.

=== Artists ===
The following artists have released albums on Shadow Mountain Records:

- Julie de Azevedo
- Jenny Oaks Baker
- Dallyn Vail Bayles
- Kurt Bestor
- Alex Boyé
- Paul Cardall
- Kenneth Cope
- Eclipse 6
- Gladys Knight
- Jericho Road
- Michael McLean
- Mercy River
- David Osmond
- Jenny Phillips
- Hilary Weeks
- Josh Wright
- Emma Nissen

== Other business ==
Deseret Book operates further business units in addition to its publishing and retail activities. Under the name Zion's Mercantile it produces home decor and religious art and holds events such as women's conferences in the United States and Canada. LDS Living is an LDS lifestyle magazine in print and online. Deseret Book Direct sells publications through catalogs, e-mail, and the DeseretBook.com website. From 2000 to 2009 it also operated an auctions website for Latter-day Saint books. Crafts and other handmade items are sold under the name of Mormon Handicraft (a brand purchased from the LDS Church's Relief Society in 1986) and food is sold through The Lion House Pantry brand. It also provides the texts of many of its books online with paid subscriptions at GospeLink.com.

In 2009, selected Deseret Book locations partnered with the LDS Church's Distribution Center and began selling official church items, such as temple garments, which had originally been available only in church distribution centers. That working relationship has expanded and now half of Deseret Book's 39 stores have been "integrated" and are half Deseret Book and half Distribution Centers.
