= Tiger (miniseries) =

2021 American biographical documentary miniseries

- Genre: Documentary
- Directed by: Matthew Heineman; Matthew Hamachek
- Music by: H. Scott Salinas
- Country of origin: United States
- Original language: English
- No. of episodes: 2

Production
- Executive producers: Matthew Heineman; Matthew Hamachek; Alex Gibney; Jeff Benedict; Armen Keteyian; Stacey Offman; Richard Perello; Sam Pollard; Bentley Weiner
- Producers: Trevor Davidoski; Jenna Millman; Joedan Okun
- Cinematography: Matt Porwoll
- Editors: Matthew Hamacheck; Nicholas Biagetti; Daniel Koehler; Monica Yeun
- Running time: 90-102 minutes
- Production companies: HBO Sports; Jigsaw Productions; Our Time Projects

Original release
- Network: HBO
- Release: January 10 – January 17, 2021

Tiger is an American 2021 two-part sports-biographical documentary miniseries about professional golfer Tiger Woods. It aired in two episodes on HBO on January 10, 2021, and January 17, 2021. The documentary is based on the 2018 book Tiger Woods by Jeff Benedict and Armen Keteyian.

== Premise ==
The documentary is based on the 2018 biography Tiger Woods and examines Woods' rise, fall, and return in the world of golf. Like the biography, the documentary explores Woods' relationship with his father, and that relationship's effect on the golfer's career. It features interviews with Woods' former caddie Steve Williams, Woods' former girlfriend, Nick Faldo, Bryant Gumbel, and Rachel Uchitel, who was involved in Woods’ infidelity scandal. Tiger notably relies on outside voices to tell Woods' story and does not include his perspective or commentary.

== Production ==
The filmmakers, Matthew Hamachek and Matthew Heineman, said that Woods declined to be interviewed for the film twice citing a contractual conflict. Woods' family does not appear in the series either.

The soundtrack includes English punk poet John Cooper Clarke's 1980 poem "Evidently Chickentown", which was also used for its ominous sound in an episode of The Sopranos in 2007.

== Responses ==
Agent Mark Steinberg called the miniseries "another unauthorized and salacious outsider attempt to paint an incomplete portrait of one of the greatest athletes of all-time" after previously denouncing the biography it was based on.

Golfer Collin Morikawa stated that unless Woods "was going to be the one narrating it, I really have no interest" in watching the documentary and that "the best way you can get to know someone is by talking to them."

A source close to Woods said that he was "not thrilled" about the documentary's release and was concerned it would tarnish the image he was working to restore.

== Reception ==
On Rotten Tomatoes, the series holds an approval rating of 73% based on 22 reviews, with an average rating of 6.83/10. The website's critical consensus reads, "Tiger is undeniably well-made - unfortunately its surface level findings shed little new light on the enigmatic golfer." On Metacritic, the series has a weighted average score of 72 out of 100, based on 16 critics, indicating "generally favorable reviews".

Brian Tallerico gave the film two and a half out of four stars in a review for RogerEbert.com, saying that film did not make him feel what it is like to be Tiger Woods. Rolling Stone said the series "lacks the same churning energy of The Last Dance". The Washington Post said the series leaves an "unrevealing portrait of a towering sports figure". The A.V. Club was more positive saying the documentary "still finds a way to present a compelling narrative in its two parts, as directors Matthew Heineman and Matthew Hamachek pull viewers into the life of a man who worked so hard to appear inhumanly perfect, both on and off the golf course."
