= Jeff Benedict =

American journalist

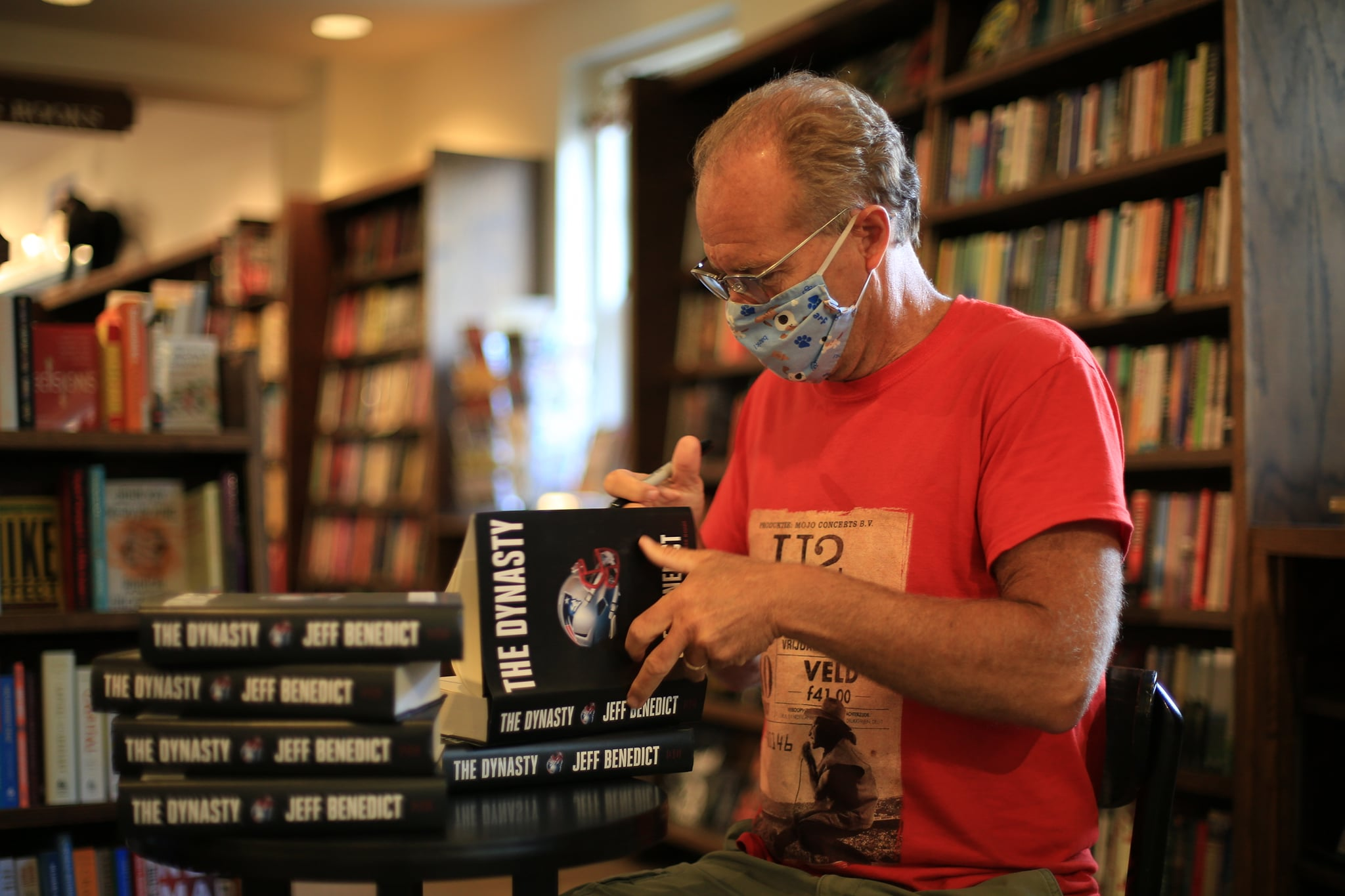
Jeff Benedict signs copies of The Dynasty

Jeff Benedict is an American author, a special features writer for Sports Illustrated, and a television and film producer. He has written for The New York Times and the Los Angeles Times, and his stories have been the basis for segments on 60 Minutes, 20/20, CBS Sunday Morning, CBS Evening News, the NFL Network, HBO Real Sports, Good Morning America, 48 Hours, and the Discovery Channel.

== Biography ==
Before becoming a journalist, Benedict was the director of research at the Center for Study of Sports and Society at Northeastern University, where he conducted groundbreaking research on athletes and violence against women. In graduate school he went on to publish a series of studies on violence against women. Then, while in law school, he worked as an assistant to the chief prosecutor in the child victims unit at the District Attorney's office in Boston.

In 2002 Benedict ran as a Democrat for U.S. Congress in Connecticut's 2nd congressional district. He lost in the Democratic primary to Joe Courtney. In 2003, Benedict partnered with Connecticut Attorney General Richard Blumenthal and founded the Connecticut Alliance Against Casino Expansion, a non-profit corporation that led the effort to repeal Connecticut's Las Vegas Nights law. Benedict also led the effort to prevent Donald Trump and other casino moguls from constructing casinos in Connecticut.

== Publications ==
Benedict has written 16 nonfiction books. His most recent book is LeBron, a comprehensive profile on basketball player LeBron James, published in April 2023. His next most recent book is The Dynasty, the definitive inside story of the New England Patriots which was published by Simon & Schuster/Avid Reader Press in 2021. In 2018, Benedict co-wrote the #1 New York Times bestselling biography of Tiger Woods. In 2021, the book was the basis of a 2-part documentary on HBO. Benedict was an executive producer. The book is currently being developed into a scripted television series, which Benedict is also executive producing. In 2016, Benedict wrote the national bestseller QB: My Life Behind the Spiral, the autobiography of Hall of Fame quarterback Steve Young. He was also a writer and creative consultant for "Steve Young: A Football Life" which was based on the book and aired on the NFL Network in 2016.

Benedict's book My Name Used to be Muhammad is the biography of a fundamentalist Muslim from Nigeria who was persecuted and imprisoned for converting to Christianity. It was a Book of the Year finalist 2013. Also in 2013, he published The System: The Glory and Scandal of Big-Time College Football, co-written with Armen Keteyian. He is also an executive producer for the motion picture Little Pink House, based on his book Little Pink House which was published in 2009.

Benedict's other books include:

- Public Heroes, Private Felons: Athletes and Crimes Against Women. Northeastern University Press. 1997. ISBN 1555533167.
- Athletes and Acquaintance Rape. Sage Series on Violence Against Women. Vol. 8. SAGE Publications. 1998. ISBN 0761909664.
- Pros and Cons: The Criminals Who Play in the NFL. Warner Books. 1998. ISBN 0446524034.
- Without Reservation: The Making of America's Most Powerful Indian Tribe and the World's Largest Casino. HarperCollins. 2000. ISBN 0060193670.
- No Bone Unturned: The Adventures of the Smithsonian's Top Forensic Scientist and the Legal Battle for America's Oldest Skeletons. HarperCollins. 2003. ISBN 0060199237.
- Out of Bounds: Inside the NBA's Culture of Rape, Violence, and Crime. HarperCollins. 2004. ISBN 0060726024.
- The Mormon Way of Doing Business: Leadership and Success Through Faith and Family. Warner Business Books. 2007. ISBN 978-0446578592.
- How to Build a Business Warren Buffett Would Buy: The R.C. Willey Story. Shadow Mountain. 2009. ISBN 978-1606410417.
- Little Pink House: A True Story of Defiance and Courage. Grand Central. 2009. ISBN 978-0446508629.
- Poisoned: The True Story of the Deadly e. Coli Outbreak That Changed the Way Americans Eat. Inspire Books. 2011. ISBN 978-0983347804.
- The System: The Glory and Scandal of Big-Time College Football. Doubleday. 2013. ISBN 978-0385536615.
- My Name Used to Be Muhammad: The True Story of a Muslim Who Became a Christian. Ensign Peak. 2013. ISBN 978-1609077105.
- QB: My Life Behind the Spiral. HarperCollins. 2016. ISBN 9781328745729.
- Tiger Woods. Simon & Schuster. 2018. ISBN 978-1501126444.
- The Dynasty. Simon & Schuster. 2020. ISBN 978-1-9821-3411-2
- LeBron. Simon & Schuster. 2023. ISBN 978-1-9821-1089-5
