= Poisoned: The True Story of the Deadly e. Coli Outbreak That Changed the Way Americans Eat =

2011 book by Jeff Benedict

Poisoned: The True Story of the Deadly e. Coli Outbreak That Changed the Way Americans Eat is a non-fiction book of investigative journalism about the 1992–1993 Jack in the Box E. coli outbreak, written by Jeff Benedict and published in 2011.

Benedict recounts the events of the outbreak in the style of a suspenseful thriller. The 2011 hardcover was followed by a paperback in 2014. A second edition in 2018 added a new chapter about the 2017–2018 South African listeriosis outbreak.
