= May Booth Talmage =

LDS Church figure

- Born: September 26, 1868; Alpine, Utah
- Died: April 6, 1944 (aged 75); Ogden, Utah
- Spouse: James E. Talmage
- Children: 8

Merry May Talmage (née Booth; September 26, 1868 – April 6, 1944) was a member of the Church of Jesus Christ of Latter-day Saints (LDS Church) and was the wife of James E. Talmage, a member of the Quorum of the Twelve Apostles. She oversaw the Relief Society in Europe from 1924 to 1927 when her husband was the president of the European Mission of the church.

== Early life ==
Merry May Booth was born on September 29, 1868, to Richard Thornton Booth and Elsie Edge in Alpine, Utah. She was the last of their ten children. Her parents were from Lancashire, England. They converted to the LDS Church and immigrated to Utah Territory in 1857. As a child, she often spent time playing in the country and exploring. She went to school at local district schools.

May and her family moved to Provo, Utah when she was 16. May began taking classes at Brigham Young Academy under Karl G. Maeser and James E. Talmage. While in school, she was the secretary of the Polysophical Society on campus. She also helped with the church's Primary Association.

After graduating from Brigham Young Academy, May moved to Kaysville, Utah, where she became a schoolteacher. Talmage visited her in Kaysville while he was studying the Great Salt Lake. The couple wed on June 14, 1888, in Manti, Utah, in the temple. Her father died in May 1888 before the wedding. The couple had eight children. James affectionately called his wife "Maia."

Shortly after getting married, James received a call from the First Presidency of the church that he was to be in charge of the Salt Lake Academy, which is now the Ensign College, so the couple moved to Salt Lake City. By 1890, they owned their own house there.

== Church service ==
While her husband was called to be a member of the Quorum of the Twelve Apostles for The Church of Jesus Christ of Latter-day Saints in 1911, May contributed to the church as well. She participated in Sunday School, Relief Society and Primary. She was called by the church in 1892 to serve on the General Board of the Young Women's Mutual Improvement Association; she served in that position for almost 40 years. May was a speaker at the North Weber State Mutual Improvement Association in 1916.

She was also chairperson of the Young Woman's Journal, which she edited for a little over a year and a half. May accompanied her husband to Europe in 1924 when he was called to be the president of the European Mission. She oversaw the Relief Society organization in Europe from 1924 to 1927.

== Contributions ==
May Talmage became a member of the executive board of the Utah Territorial Women's Suffrage Association. In 1893, she represented Utah at the World Congress of Women at the Chicago World's Fair. In that same year, her mother died. She was voted vice-president of the BYU Alumni Association in 1895. She also served as a delegate to the Tri-ennial National Council of Women meeting in 1906. She was the vice-president of the Free Kindergarten Association and served as the first president of the Parent-Teacher Association at Lowell School in Salt Lake City. She was also a member of the Authors' Club and the Friendship Circle.

Her husband died on July 27, 1933. May's daughter Elsie died on August 2, 1935. May later visited Provo to see friends and family in 1939. She died on April 6, 1944 in Ogden, Utah.

== Publications ==
- "My Little Friend". The Relief Society Magazine. 11 (1): 583–585. November 1922.
- "Letter to Prest. Clarissa S. Williams and the General Board". The Relief Society Magazine. 13 (1): 6–16. January 1926.
- "Letter to Prest. Clarissa S. Williams and the General Board: The Swiss-German Mission". The Relief Society Magazine. 13 (2): 65–72. February 1926.
- "Norway and Sweden". The Relief Society Magazine. 14 (2): 62–67. February 1927.
- "Narvik And Bergen". The Relief Society Magazine. 14 (3): 123–129. March 1927.
- "Julia A. Farnsworth Lund". The Relief Society Magazine. 15 (1): 19–21. January 1928.
- "A Visit to the Relief Societies of the French Mission". The Relief Society Magazine. 15 (4): 191–198. April 1928.
- "Conference Address". The Relief Society Magazine. 15 (7): 366–368. July 1928.
- "To President Heber J. Grant". The Relief Society Magazine. 24 (5): 290–291. May 1937.
- "Mary Connelly Kimball". The Relief Society Magazine. 15 (1): 3–6. January 1938.
