= Articles of Faith (Talmage book) =

1899 book by James E. Talmage

The Articles of Faith: A Series of Lectures on the Principal Doctrines of the Church of Jesus Christ of Latter-day Saints
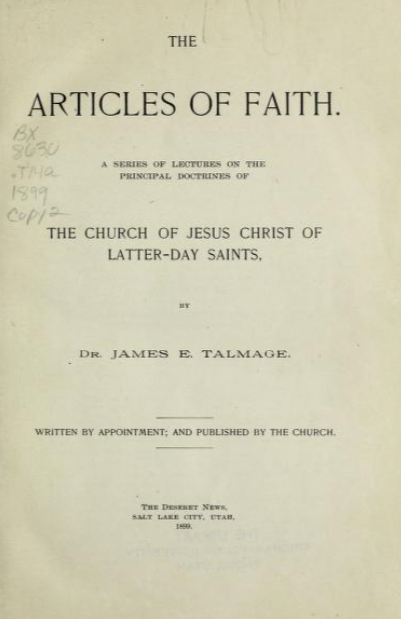
- Title page for The Articles of Faith: A Series of Lectures on the Principal Doctrines of the Church of Jesus Christ of Latter-day Saints (1899)
- Author: James E. Talmage
- Language: English
- Publisher: The Church of Jesus Christ of Latter-day Saints
- Publication date: 1899
- Publication place: United States
- Pages: 490

The Articles of Faith: A Series of Lectures on the Principal Doctrines of the Church of Jesus Christ of Latter-day Saints is an 1899 book by James E. Talmage about doctrines of the Church of Jesus Christ of Latter-day Saints (LDS Church). The name of the book is taken from the LDS Church's "Articles of Faith", an 1842 creed written by Joseph Smith.

Smith's "Articles of Faith" became part of the LDS Church's scriptural canon in 1880 as part of the Pearl of Great Price. In 1891, when the First Presidency of the LDS Church asked Talmage to produce a work of theology that could be used in church schools, Talmage decided to use Smith's Articles of Faith as an outline of his work. He first delivered the material that he would organize into a book in a series of lectures delivered in 1893 at Latter-day Saints' University in Salt Lake City, Utah, which Talmage was the president of at the time.

First published in 1899, Talmage's work is composed of 24 chapters. The first edition was published by the LDS Church, and has gone through over 50 English-language editions. It has also been translated and published in 13 other languages. The book continues to be published today by Deseret Book, a publishing company owned by the church.

Like Talmage's later work Jesus the Christ, Articles of Faith is today regarded as a Mormon classic. For many years, Articles of Faith and Jesus the Christ were among the few non-scriptural works that full-time LDS Church missionaries were asked to study. However, Articles of Faith is no longer part of the "approved missionary library."
