= Jericho Road =

US musical group

- Origin: United States
- Genres: Pop, religious music
- Years active: 2001–present
- Labels: Jericho Road, Shadow Mountain, Mormon Tabernacle, American Wise Guy
- Members: Abe Mills; Dave Kimball; Justin Smith; Bret Bryce
- Website: jerichoroadmusic.com

Jericho Road is a Latter-day Saint boy band that sings religious music. The band's members are Abe Mills (from St. Louis, Missouri), Dave Kimball (Sandy, Utah), Justin Smith (Parma, Idaho), and Bret Bryce (Knoxville, Tennessee).

== Biography ==
The band members met at Brigham Young University while performing in the group The Young Ambassadors, and developed close friendships performing together. After expressing strong desires to use their performing talents in a way that would be both entertaining and inspiring, they decided to form a new group, Jericho Road.

When Abe Mills, Bret Bryce, Dave Kimball, and Justin Smith stepped onto the music scene as Jericho Road in August 2001, they were met with immediate success. Their self-titled debut release broke all sales records for their label Shadow Mountain, selling over 10,000 copies in its first week. Nearly 150,000 copies later, the band continues to share their music and conviction with fans of all faiths throughout the world.

Jericho Road has teamed up with many award-winning songwriters and musicians. These include Christian artists Steve Siler, Lowell Alexander, and Scott Krippayne.

== Background of performers ==
Abdullah R. "Abe" Mills was born and raised in St. Louis, Missouri. His family converted to the Church of Jesus Christ of Latter-day Saints when he was about six. Mills served his mission in the Texas Houston Mission. He met his wife Rachel, who grew up in Branson, Missouri at BYU. In addition to being part of Young Ambassadors, Mills was a walk-on member of the BYU Cougars football team. Mills majored in broadcast journalism. He was also a host on the LDS Church produced show "Center Street". The Mills later lived in Kalamazoo with their five children. At a later date Mills moved to Florida. In about 2017 he shifted to fulltime creating a YouTube series with his family entitled "Sunshine Mafia".

== Awards and fan base ==
In 2003, Jericho Road won a Listeners Choice Award for Album of the Year (True North) and Group Artist of the Year. They also received a 2003 Pearl Award for Performing Artist of the Year and Contemporary Recording of the Year (A New Day from the album "True North").

Jericho Road's fan base and recognition have steadily grown, with their albums sales approaching 150,000 CDs and millions of dollars in sales. Having completed two tours throughout the West coast and Canada in 2002 and 2003, the band also performed in Washington D.C., Kansas, Tennessee, Georgia, and Alabama. Radio stations across the country (both contemporary and Christian) have helped them gain national attention. "Finding My Way Back to You", the hit single from their second album, was on the Top 5 most-requested list at KXEN in St. Louis.

== International performances ==
In the fall of 2003 the group was asked to sing the National Anthem at the 100th anniversary of the first World Series at Dodgertown Sports & Conference Center in Vero Beach, Florida. The Diamond Dreams Fantasy Baseball organization sponsored their trip and even let them play in the games.

From 2005-2007 the group has gained more international attention and exposure, completing two tours to the United Kingdom and Ireland, a sold-out week-long tour to Chile last July, and recent performances in Florida, Washington, Oregon, and California.

Jericho Road also toured to seven cities in Japan from February 15–25, 2007, touring to Okinawa, Fukuoka, Hiroshima, Osaka, Nagoya, Tokyo, and Sendai.

== Discography ==
- Jericho Road – released November 20, 2001
- True North – released October 1, 2002
- What Matters Most – released October 15, 2002
- Deeper Still EP – released October 7, 2003
- There Is More – released September 6, 2005
- Best of Jericho Road – released October 1, 2006
- Day of Rest – released September 6, 2010
