= Tiger Woods (book) =

2018 biography of the professional golfer

- Front cover art for Tiger Woods.
- Author: Jeff Benedict; Armen Keteyian
- Language: English
- Genre: Sports
- Publisher: Simon & Schuster
- Publication date: 27 March 2018
- Publication place: United States
- Media type: Print, digital
- Pages: 512 pp
- ISBN: 978-1501126420

Tiger Woods is a 2018 biography of professional golfer Tiger Woods written by Jeff Benedict and Armen Keteyian. It is the second book co-authored by Benedict and Keteyian, who published The System: The Glory and Scandal of Big-Time College Football in 2013. The book was adapted as Tiger, a two-part HBO miniseries in 2021.

== Background ==
Prior to writing the book, Benedict and Keteyian read over 20 books previously published about Woods' life, including Woods' own memoir, The 1997 Masters: My Story. The authors also read articles by Wright Thompson, Gary Smith, Frank Deford and others as they created a timeline of Woods' life that, once complete, was over 70,000 words in length.

More than 250 people were interviewed for the book. Keteyian interviewed Mark O'Meara for the book while O'Meara was playing a round at the 2017 Conquistadores Classic. O'Meara's ex-wife, Alicia O'Meara, was also interviewed several times for the book. The authors declined an on-the-record interview Woods himself for the book as they were not willing to meet Woods' conditions for such an interview, and the authors were not able to conduct any off-the-record conversations with Woods himself.

Keteyian said the reason for writing the book was to attempt to answer the question, "Who is Tiger Woods?"

== Synopsis ==
The biography opens with the 2009 car accident on the day after Thanksgiving that precipitated Woods' infidelity scandal and fallout.

From The Financial Times:

"Much time is spent on the pathologies of his parents, his African-American father Earl and Thai mother Kultida, whom Earl met when he was an army officer in Asia and still married to his first wife. While his father is credited with teaching their son the game and pushing him to greatness, Tida, as she is known, is found to be more cold-blooded and the source of his killer instinct...Benedict and Keteyian provide extensive details of Tiger’s famous nastiness, which was helpful in dispatching golf foes and deployed against anyone he no longer required. And there are painstaking descriptions of his escapades with Las Vegas hostesses and waffle house waitresses."

== Reception ==
Tiger Woods was a New York Times bestseller, reaching #5 overall in the category of Hardcover Nonfiction.

The book has received mostly positive reviews, with critics noting the authors' treatment of Woods' life off the course. One writer said, "Thankfully, the authors’ spare us more than fleeting snippets of Woods’ on-course exploits. Their interest is more on the human drama of Woods’ career." In one review, the New York Times said, "It’s a confident and substantial book that’s nearly as sleek as a Christopher Nolan movie. It makes a sweet sound, like a well-struck golf ball." Golf Digest said Tiger Woods is, "a book brimming with revealing details about Woods’ unique background, his rise to superstardom and the myriad character flaws that contributed to his well-publicized fall." A review in The New Yorker said the book is, "comprehensive, propulsive, packed with incident...and unsparing with regard to its subject."

Tiger Woods was criticized as factually inaccurate by Woods' lawyers. Doug Band, an aide to former President Bill Clinton, who was present for a round of golf played between Woods and Clinton, also questioned the accuracy of the book, saying of an account of the round, "there is hardly an accurate or true word in the excerpt.” Keteyan and Benedict responded to the criticism on ESPN's Outside the Lines, explaining that the "egregious errors" that Woods' lawyers point to are relatively minor discrepancies.

== Media adaptation ==
In March 2018, filmmaker Alex Gibney was reported to be developing a documentary series based on Tiger Woods. Gibney executive produced Tiger, which released on HBO in January 2021.

In May 2019, after Woods's win at the 2019 Masters, Deadline Hollywood announced that Benedict had reached an agreement with Wheelhouse Entertainment to develop a scripted miniseries based on the book.
