= QB: My Life Behind the Spiral =

2016 memoir by Steve Young and Jeff Bendict

- Author: Steve Young and Jeff Benedict
- Language: English
- Genre: Memoir
- Published: October 11, 2016
- Publisher: Houghton Mifflin
- Publication date: October 11, 2016
- Publication place: United States
- Media type: Print (Hardcover, Paperback)
- Pages: 389 pp
- ISBN: 0544845765

QB: My Life Behind the Spiral is a 2016 memoir written by Hall of Fame NFL quarterback Steve Young and sports journalist Jeff Benedict.

== Background ==
Steve Young has stated that his initial interest for having a memoir came in 2010, when he realized his four kids, who were all born after he retired from football, knew little of his life. Sports writer Jeff Benedict was hired, and he spoke to Young's friends and former teammates for research. Young intended the collection of notes to just be for personal family purposes, but he eventually decided to co-write an entire book with Benedict, publishing it in 2016.

== Summary ==
The memoir chronologically explores Young's challenging football career, from being an eighth string quarterback at BYU, to signing a 40 million dollar contract with the soon defunct L.A. Express, to his tumultuous two years with the Tampa Bay Buccaneers, to his rivalry with San Francisco 49ers' quarterback Joe Montana, and to his eventual MVP and Super Bowl wins. Young describes his relationships with his family, friends and teammates. He also discussed personal things, like his cultural and spiritual impacts of being a lifelong member of the Church of Jesus Christ of Latter day Saints, as well as his severe anxiety.

== Reception ==
The book reached number six on the New York Times Best Sellers list in the sports and fitness category.

The memoir was the main source for the fourth episode of A Football Life, produced by NFL Films, which was aired the week it was published. Later in 2022, Young wrote The Law of Love, further discussing his religious and spiritual influences.
