= April 6 (LDS Church) =

Date of the formal organization of the LDS Church

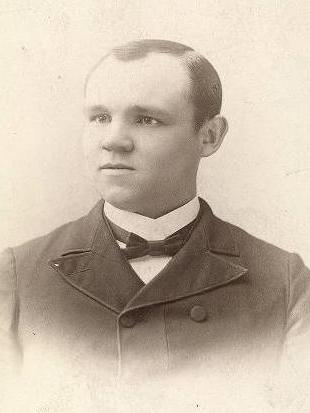
James E. Talmage, a member of the Quorum of the Twelve Apostles of The Church of Jesus Christ of Latter-day Saints from 1911 to 1933. The common belief among Latter-day Saints that Jesus Christ was born on April 6 can be traced to his 1915 book Jesus the Christ

April 6 is the date of the formal organization of The Church of Jesus Christ of Latter-day Saints in 1830. Rooted in Mormon scriptures, it was believed to have been chosen by divine authority. This date plays an important role in the theology and tradition of the church, commemorating its founding and also being proposed as the date of the birth of Jesus Christ. As an integral part of Mormon history, it holds symbolic significance for other denominations within the Latter-day Saint movement as well.

== In The Church of Jesus Christ of Latter-day Saints ==
According to Latter-day Saint beliefs, Joseph Smith, the first President of the Church and founder of the Latter-day Saint movement, reestablished the Church of Christ on earth on this specific day by heavenly authority. The church commemorates this date during the first of its two general conferences held each calendar year, which typically occurs around April 6.

The significance of this date for Latter-day Saints stems from various factors. The frequent debates in Christian tradition concerning the exact date of Jesus Christ's birth have made little impact on Latter-day Saint thought. However, some church presidents, including Harold B. Lee and Spencer W. Kimball, affirmed that April 6 is the actual date of Christ's birth, although they still encouraged the faithful to celebrate Christmas in line with the broader Christian tradition. Others, like Gordon B. Hinckley, spoke positively on the subject but without offering detailed explanations. The belief that Jesus was born on April 6, at least within this particular Latter-day Saint denomination, can be traced back to the 1915 book Jesus the Christ by James E. Talmage, a member of the Quorum of the Twelve Apostles.

At the same time, the Church of Jesus Christ of Latter-day Saints does not hold an official position on the exact year of Christ's birth. Bruce R. McConkie, another member of the Quorum of the Twelve Apostles and a noted authority on Latter-day Saint doctrine, perhaps best expressed the church leadership's stance on this issue. He stated that, given the current state of knowledge – both church-related and external – there is no definitive way to determine when the exact day of Jesus’ birth occurred.

A verse in the first chapter of the 20th section of the Doctrine and Covenants suggests, according to some, a connection between Christ’s birth and the date of the church’s founding. However, this idea remains controversial and a subject of debate among Latter-day Saint theologians. The placement of this teaching in the core Latter-day Saint canon is somewhat ambiguous, a characteristic that can be seen in the historical perspective of Latter-day Saint thought. Joseph Smith, for instance, celebrated Christmas on 25 December, and his successors – Brigham Young, John Taylor, Wilford Woodruff, and Lorenzo Snow – did not comment on the matter. The early influential church leader and respected theologian Orson Pratt claimed that Christ was born on 11 April, basing this view on the Book of Mormon. His belief did not gain widespread acceptance and eventually fell into obscurity. Although the idea that Christ was born in April became embedded in the collective consciousness of Latter-day Saints, it even found expression in the First Presidency’s 1901 Christmas message. Nonetheless, varying opinions persisted among the church’s highest priesthood councils. Hyrum M. Smith, in his posthumously published A Commentary on the Doctrine and Covenants (1919), was highly skeptical of linking the day of Christ's birth with the founding date of the church.

While the historical and theological significance of this date is primarily tied to its connection with the organization of the church and Christ, it can also be seen within a broader context. The symbolic nature of this date is evident throughout the church's history. Several important events, such as the transfer of Joseph and Hyrum Smith from Liberty Jail to Gallatin for a hearing before a grand jury on 6 April 1839, the laying of the cornerstone for the Nauvoo Temple on 6 April 1841, and the laying of the cornerstone for the Salt Lake Temple on 6 April 1853, all took place on this date. The custom of aligning key church events with this day has become a vibrant part of Latter-day Saint tradition. For instance, the Salt Lake Temple was dedicated on 6 April 1893, and earlier, in 1877, the St. George Utah Temple was dedicated on this date. More recently, on 6 April 2000, the Palmyra New York Temple was dedicated.

== In other denominations of the Latter-day Saint movement ==
As an integral part of Mormon history, this date appears in various religious organizations that trace their origins to Joseph Smith. It retains its symbolic significance, for example, in the Community of Christ, known until 2001 as the Reorganized Church of Jesus Christ of Latter Day Saints. Consequently, this religious community has also adopted the practice of placing significant events on this date. Joseph Smith III, the eldest son of Joseph Smith, was ordained as prophet-president on 6 April 1860 during a conference in Amboy, Illinois. The groundbreaking ceremony for the Independence Temple in Missouri took place on 6 April 1990, and the aforementioned name change to the Community of Christ became effective on 6 April 2001. One of the youngest denominations formed after breaking away from the Community of Christ, namely the Remnant Church of Jesus Christ of Latter Day Saints, also attaches great significance to this date. It associates the day with the prophecy of the coming of a "strong and mighty one", believing that this prophecy was fulfilled on 6 April 2002 when Frederick Niels Larsen, a great-great-grandson of Joseph Smith, was ordained as the president of the Remnant Church.

One of the earliest groups to break away from the Church of Jesus Christ of Latter-day Saints after the saints’ migration to Utah also referenced this date. The Church of the Firstborn, founded by Joseph Morris, chose 6 April 1861 as the date of its formal organization. Israel A.J. Dennis, the founder of the short-lived Church of the Firstborn, selected 6 April 1895 to enter into a plural marriage. This was the only such case in Utah during the period between the official abandonment of polygamy by the Church of Jesus Christ of Latter-day Saints in 1890 and 1904, when the largest Mormon denomination definitively severed ties with plural marriage. Dennis deliberately referred to the date of the original church organization by Joseph Smith, signaling institutional continuity, which later foreshadowed the emergence of Mormon fundamentalist groups.

This attachment to the specific date is also evident in groups directly connected with Mormon fundamentalism. Warren Jeffs, president of the Fundamentalist Church of Jesus Christ of Latter-day Saints, predicted that this date would mark the end of the world, fitting into a series of unfulfilled apocalyptic prophecies made by Jeffs. This denomination acknowledges the traditional role of the date among Latter-day Saints. Meanwhile, the True Branch of the Church of Jesus Christ of Latter-day Saints, founded by Gerald W. Peterson Jr., believes that on the date of its formal organization – 6 April 1978 – the rightful priesthood authority was taken from the leaders of the Church of Jesus Christ of Latter-day Saints. The True Branch also believes that this authority and the associated keys were personally given to their leadership by Joseph Smith, fulfilling the prophecy in the 85th section of the Doctrine and Covenants, which foretells the coming of a "strong and mighty one to set order in the house of God". Another group referring to this date in its tradition is the Church of Jesus Christ in Solemn Assembly, founded by Alexandar Joseph, which held its first general conference in Redlands, California, on 6 April 1973.

== Bibliography ==
- Russell, William D. (2008). "The Last Smith Presidents and the Transformation of the RLDS Church". Journal of Mormon History. 34 (3).
- Chadwick, Jeffrey R. (2010). "Dating the Birth of Christ" (PDF). Brigham Young University Studies Quarterly. 49 (4). Brigham Young University. ISSN 2167-8472.
- Wójtowicz, Artur (2016). "Podziały w Kościele mormońskim – tło historyczne i stan dzisiejszy" [Divisions in the Mormon Church – Historical Background and Current State]. Kultura i Wartości (in Polish). 17. ISSN 2299-7806.
- Ludlow, Daniel H., ed. (1992). Encyclopedia of Mormonism. New York: Macmillan Publishing. ISBN 978-0-02-904040-9.
