= Kenneth Cope (musician) =

American singer

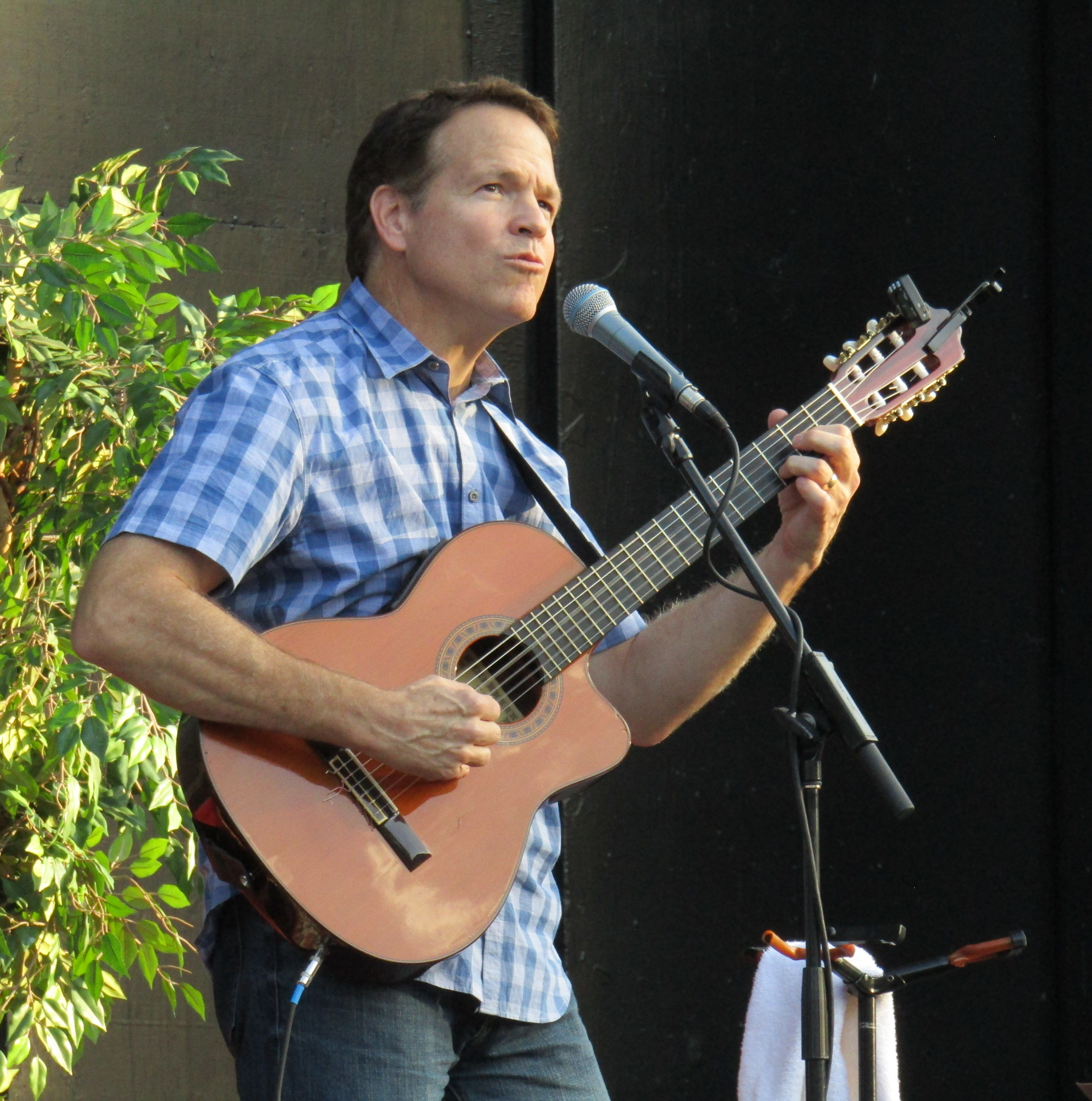
- Cope performing in Orem, Utah, in 2018
- Born: June 12, 1961 (age 64); Salt Lake City, Utah, U.S.
- Occupations: Composer, singer

Kenneth Cope (born June 12, 1961) is an American composer and performer of religious music geared towards Latter-day Saints. His first album, Heaven — Don't Miss It For The World, was released in 1988. His twelfth album, All About You, was released in March 2008. His album, Son of Man, was released in 2018.

Cope lived in Houston, Texas, during his high school years and attended the High School for the Performing and Visual Arts. He has been closely associated with the music of Especially for Youth (EFY), with seven EFY albums having songs he composed. He served as a missionary for the Church of Jesus Christ of Latter-day Saints in Switzerland and France from 1980 to 1982. He currently resides in Salt Lake City, Utah and has served as a bishop.

He and his wife have three children.
