= Hilary Weeks =

American Christian musician

- Born: Hilary Novakovich; March 7, 1970 (age 56); Colorado, U.S.
- Origin: Utah, U.S.
- Genres: Worship, gospel, Christian country, Christian pop
- Occupations: Singer, songwriter
- Instruments: Vocals, piano
- Years active: 1996–present
- Labels: Deseret, Shadow Mountain
- Website: hilaryweeks.com

Hilary Weeks (née Novakovich; born March 7, 1970) is an American Christian musician and Latter-Day Saint singer, who primarily plays a worship and gospel music version of Christian country and Christian pop. She has released ten musical works, with eight of those being studio albums, He Hears Me (1996), Lead Me Home (1998) and I Will Not Forget (2000), Day of Praise (2004), If I Only Had Today (2008), Every Step (2011), Say Love (2013), Say Love (2013), and, Love Your Life (2016), while she released two holiday albums, Christmastime (2006) and Christmas Once Again (2009). Her last four musical works charted on various Billboard magazine charts.

== Early life ==
Weeks was born Hilary Novakovich, on March 7, 1970, in Colorado, while she was raised in Alaska. She graduated from Brigham Young University with her baccalaureate of arts in 1993 from their music department.

== Career ==
Her music recording career started in 1996, with the studio album He Hears Me, that was released by Deseret Book. She then went onto release four more studio albums, Lead Me Home in 1998, I Will Not Forget in 2000, Day of Praise in 2004, If I Only Had Today on September 17, 2008. While her next two albums, Every Step and Say Love, released on October 25, 2011, and September 9, 2013, correspondingly, while they charted each on three Billboard magazine charts, The Billboard 200 at Nos. 102 and 161, respectively, Christian Albums at Nos. 6 and 9, correspondingly, and Independent Albums at Nos. 23 and 30, respectively. She was the first Mormon to have an album peak in the Top-10 of the Christian Albums chart. The eighth studio album, Love Your Life, was released on September 16, 2016, and it charted on the Christian Albums chart at No. 7, and Independent Albums chart at No. 24.

She has released two holiday albums, Christmastime, on November 7, 2006, and her most commercially successful one, Christmas Once Again, on October 13, 2009, where it peaked at Nos. 26 and 40 on the Holiday Albums and Heatseekers Albums charts.

== Personal life ==
She is married to Timothy Weeks, and they have four daughters, residing in Utah. Weeks was called by Forbes one of the "40 Women to Watch Over 40".

== Discography ==
Studio albums

List of studio albums, with selected chart positions
Title	Album details	Peak chart positions		
Title	Album details	US	US Chr	US Ind
He Hears Me	Released: 1996; Label: Deseret; CD, digital download	–	–	–
Lead Me Home	Released: 1998; Label: Deseret; CD, digital download	–	–	–
I Will Not Forget	Released: 2000; Label: Deseret; CD, digital download	–	–	–
Day of Praise	Released: 2004; Label: Shadow Mountain; CD, digital download	–	–	–
If I Only Had Today	Released: September 17, 2008; Label: Shadow Mountain; CD, digital download	–	–	–
Every Step	Released: October 25, 2011; Label: Shadow Mountain; CD, digital download	102	6	23
Say Love	Released: September 9, 2013; Label: Shadow Mountain; CD, digital download	161	9	30
Love Your Life	Released: September 16, 2016; Label: Shadow Mountain; CD, digital download	–	7	24

Holiday albums

List of holiday albums, with selected chart positions
Title	Album details	Peak chart positions	
Title	Album details	US Hol	US Heat
Christmastime	Released: November 7, 2006; Label: Shadow Mountain; CD, digital download	–	–
Christmas Once Again	Released: October 13, 2009; Label: Shadow Mountain; CD, digital download	26	40
