= Book of Moroni =

Part of the Book of Mormon

The Book of Moroni (/məˈroʊnaɪ/) is the last of the books that make up the Book of Mormon. According to the text it was written by the prophet Moroni sometime between 400 and 421 CE. Moroni consists of ten chapters.

== Narrative ==
Moroni's people had been destroyed by the Lamanites down to the very last person. They were hunting Moroni so they could make the genocide complete. But when he was not fleeing for his life, he took the time to write a few things that might be edifying to those same Lamanites.

The first thing he wrote down was the procedure that Jesus used to make apostles, priests, and teachers. Then he described the procedure for administering the ordinances of the Last Supper and baptism. If a member of the church committed sin, and three witnesses condemned them before the church elders and they still did not repent, then their names were blotted out of the church rolls.

Moroni chapter 8 is an epistle from Mormon to his son Moroni written soon after his son was elevated to the ministry, and it focuses almost solely on the doctrine of baptism. Specifically, it calls infant baptism extreme error.

Mormon says that Jesus came to call sinners to repentance, but children are not capable of committing sin. Mormon denies the dogma of original sin.

In Moroni chapter 9, his father Mormon reports that he is still alive, but the Lamanites were victorious in battle, and a number of leading Nephites have been slain. Mormon fears that the Lamanites will utterly destroy his people. Nevertheless, he is still preaching the Word of God to them, but when he uses harsh words they get angry, and when he uses soft words they harden their hearts against it.

The Lamanites took many prisoners in the battle. They slew all the men. They fed to the women the flesh of their husbands and they fed the children the flesh of their fathers, and gave them almost no water.

Still, these atrocities pale in comparison to those of the Nephites in Mariantum, who availed themselves of the daughters of the Lamanites, tortured them to death, and ate their flesh. Mormon asks his son, rhetorically, how God could be expected to withhold judgment from such a people. He especially grieves for the widows and their daughters in Sherrizah, who are starving because both armies have carried away most of the food. And Mormon can do nothing for them, because the army of the Lamanites is between him and that city.

In 421 CE, Moroni wrote a few more things before adding his plates to the ones his father sealed up in the hill Cumorah. He asks anyone who reads these records in the latter days to ponder them in his heart and ask God in prayer, in the name of Jesus Christ, if the things are true. And if they ask with a sincere heart, the truth of them will be made manifest through the power of the Holy Spirit.

== Analysis ==
Chapter 1 is a short introduction. Chapters 2–6 contain some direction as to how the church was organized. The ordinances of baptism, the Gift of the Holy Ghost, and the sacrament are detailed. Also, some general instruction on the laws in the church are given.

Chapter 7 is a sermon that Mormon gave to the Nephites. This sermon focuses on the essence of good and evil.

Mormon finishes by talking about miracles, faith, hope, and charity.

Chapters 8 and 9 contain two epistles to Moroni from his father, Mormon. The first talks about the beginnings of apostasy among the Nephites, focusing particularly on the practice of infant baptism. The second details the awful state of the Nephites and foreshadows their destruction.

Chapter 10 contains Moroni's Promise and some advice for people in the present day. He writes about spiritual gifts, faith, hope and charity. Moroni declares that his words are the words of one "speaking out of the dust" which alludes to a prophecy of Isaiah (see Isaiah 29:4).

== Notes ==
Book of Moroni Additions by Moroni
Preceded by Ether	Book of Mormon	End
