= James E. Talmage =

Religious leader and academic

Quorum of the Twelve Apostles
- 8 December 1911 – 27 July 1933
- Called by: Joseph F. Smith

LDS Church Apostle
- 8 December 1911 – 27 July 1933
- Called by: Joseph F. Smith
- Reason: Death of John Henry Smith; Charles W. Penrose added to First Presidency
- Reorganization at end of term: Charles A. Callis ordained

3rd President of the University of Utah
- Predecessor: Joseph T. Kingsbury
- Successor: John A. Widtsoe

Personal details
- Born: James Edward Talmage; 21 September 1862; Hungerford, Berkshire, England
- Died: 27 July 1933 (aged 70); Salt Lake City, Utah, U.S.
- Resting place: Salt Lake City Cemetery; 40°46′37.92″N 111°51′28.8″W
- Spouse(s): Merry May Booth
- Children: 8

James Edward Talmage (21 September 1862 – 27 July 1933) was an English chemist, geologist, and religious leader who served as a member of the Quorum of the Twelve Apostles of the Church of Jesus Christ of Latter-day Saints (LDS Church) from 1911 until his death.

A professor at Brigham Young Academy (BYA) and University of Utah (U of U), Talmage also served as president of the U of U and Latter-day Saints' University. In addition to his academic career, Talmage authored several books on religion, the most prominent of which are Jesus the Christ and Articles of Faith which remain classics in Mormon literature more than a century after publication. An academic and religious scholar, Talmage did not believe that science conflicted with his religious views. Regarding the conflicting Mormon views on evolution, Talmage attempted to mediate between church leaders B. H. Roberts and Joseph Fielding Smith who disagreed about evolution and the origin of man. In addition to his academic and religious involvement, Talmage was involved in local political leadership in Provo as a city council member, alderman, and justice of the peace.

== Early life and education ==
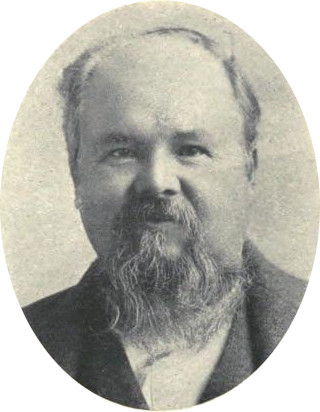
Talmage's father, James Joyce Talmage

James E. Talmage, the first son of Susannah Preater and James Joyce Talmage, was born on 21 September 1862 and raised in Hungerford, Berkshire, England. He was born in the Bell Inn, a hotel in Hungerford, where his father was the manager. Talmage's parents converted to the LDS Church, probably in the 1850s before his birth. Neighbors and local clergy did not like the Talmage family's membership in the LDS Church or their innkeeping business, which included serving alcoholic beverages during the temperance movement. Shortly after Talmage's birth, his family moved into a cottage in Edington, where most of his ten younger siblings were born. Talmage moved to Rambury to stay with his grandfather at the age of two. There he attended infant schools and received some schooling from his grandfather. He returned to Hungerford to live with his parents at age five. As Talmage was spending his time helping take care of his siblings and helping at the inn, he attended school sporadically for the next three years.

At the age of twelve, he graduated from elementary school, passing the Oxford Diocesan Association exam for a second-class certificate. Talmage received a distinguished primary education and was named an Oxford Diocesan Prize Scholar after six years of schooling. He was baptized a member of LDS Church at age 10 on 15 June 1873, but due to local hostilities toward Latter-day Saints, he was baptized in secret at night. The same year he accidentally pierced his younger brother's (Albert) eye with a digging fork, blinding him. He moved with his family to Provo, Utah Territory, in 1876. In Provo, he studied the Normal Course at BYA, with Karl G. Maeser as one of his teachers; he graduated in 1879 at the age of seventeen. He became an instructor at BYA while continuing to study. In 1881, Talmage became the first graduate from the Scientific Department at BYA and the first student from BYA to receive a college degree.

== Further education and career ==
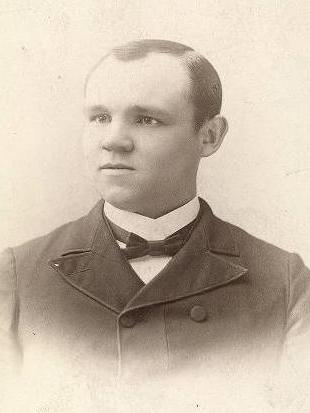
Talmage as a young man, photo by Charles Roscoe Savage

Talmage's early predilection was for the sciences, and in 1882 and 1883 he took selected courses in chemistry and geology at Lehigh University in Bethlehem, Pennsylvania. After graduating, he started advanced work at Johns Hopkins University in Baltimore, Maryland, in 1883. In the spring of 1884, while at Johns Hopkins, Talmage journaled about many laboratory experiments, including one on the ingestion of hashish. After researching at Johns Hopkins, he returned to BYA and became a professor of geology and chemistry. Shortly after returning to BYA, Talmage became the counselor (chief assistant) to its principal, Maeser, and worked as acting principal during Maeser's absence. He also became a member of BYA's board of trustees, an alternate member of the Utah Stake high council and was a common speaker at youth meetings across Utah county.

That same year, Talmage was elected as a People's Party candidate to the Provo City Council. His main goal in joining the city council was to implement anti-saloon legislation, but he did not succeed. Shortly before taking office as a member of the city council, Talmage had a lab accident that nearly cost him his sight. A few months later, he was elected an alderman which added judicial as well as legislative duties to his assignments.

=== LDS College ===
In the summer of 1888, Talmage was recruited by the church's First Presidency to lead the new Salt Lake Stake Academy in Salt Lake City, a high school for the stake, where he worked closely with Angus M. Cannon. In 1889, the Salt Lake Stake Academy was renamed LDS College and Talmage continued as its head until 1892. While in this position he was recruited widely to give lectures to civic groups, various assemblies connected with the LDS Church and other groups. One of Talmage's first tasks as principal of LDS College was to write a science textbook for the youth in the school. He produced First Book of Nature which went to press in November 1888. In 1891, Talmage published a work entitled Domestic Science at the urging of Wilford Woodruff and the other members of the First Presidency. This was a more general work on science aimed at an older audience. In April 1889, Talmage was appointed a member of the examining board for all schools of LDS Church, along with Maeser and Joseph M. Tanner. This board approved teachers to teach with any school run by the church.

In January 1891, Talmage was replaced at LDS College by his assistant, Willard Done. Talmage was appointed, along with Willard Young, to form a new university to be run by the LDS Church in Salt Lake City, called Young University. He continued lecturing on scientific subjects at LDS College through the end of that academic year.

=== U of U president ===
In the summer of 1894, an agreement was made between the LDS Church's First Presidency and representatives of the U of U. The agreement allowed for Talmage to become the institution's president, in return for which the church donated the resources it had gathered for Brigham Young University to the U of U and funded the creation of the chair of geology, to which Talmage was appointed.

Shortly after Talmage became the university's president, a department of philosophy was created. Also during his tenure, the department of history and civics was created, and the school of mines was organized. In 1896, the U of U organized a department of economics and sociology, with George Coray as head. Coray was also made head of the library. In 1897, Talmage was able to persuade the state legislature to appropriate money for the expansion of the university library.

Talmage also organized and directed a program of evening lectures run by the university, where he served on the lecture steering committee. The lectures were mainly aimed at the general public. Also under Talmage's direction the university began publication of the U of U Quarterly.

=== Academic citizenship ===
In 1891, Talmage became curator of the Deseret Museum. In 1909, while Talmage was serving as the director of the Deseret Museum, he went to Detroit, Michigan, in November of that year to participate in diggings connected with the Scotford-Soper-Savage relics craze. Talmage would go on to denounce these findings as a forgery in the September 1911 edition of the Deseret Museum Bulletin in an article entitled, "The Michigan Relics: A Story of Forgery and Deception". In 1911, after becoming a member of the Quorum of the Twelve Apostles, his son, Sterling Talmage, replaced him as curator of Deseret Museum.

Talmage spent much of the summer of 1890 in Britain. His main goal was attending the meeting of the Royal Microscopical Society where he gave a lecture on the Great Salt Lake and its brine shrimp. He also presented some horned toads that were then donated to a branch of the British Museum. During this trip, he regularly participated with missionaries of the LDS Church in street and other meetings. He also spent some time in and around Hungerford gathering records of his ancestors to do their temple work. He then traveled continental Europe, including Italy, with Reed Smoot and two other missionaries about to return home.

For many years, Talmage was a Fellow of the following learned societies: the Royal Microscopical Society (London), the Royal Scottish Geographical Society (Edinburgh), the Geological Society (London), the Geological Society of America, the Royal Society of Edinburgh, and the American Association for the Advancement of Science. He was also an Associate of the Philosophical Society of Great Britain, or Victoria Institute. He received a bachelor's degree from Lehigh University in 1891 and a PhD from Illinois Wesleyan University for nonresident work in 1896. In 1912, Talmage received an honorary PhD from Lehigh University. He was the president of Latter-day Saints' University from 1889 to 1894 and then was president of the University of Deseret from 1894 to 1897. Talmage became president of the U of U in 1893 and continued there until 1897. From 1897 until 1907 he held the chair of geology at the U of U.

=== Mining consultant ===
From the late 1890s to 1911, Talmage worked as an independent mining consultant and served as a scientific consultant in legal disputes surrounding Utah's mining industry. Talmage was an expert in mining and applied chemistry and had cultivated a positive reputation in his various religious and civic leadership positions. Due to his financial success in consulting, he officially ended his academic career in 1907.

Perhaps the most controversial mine Talmage analyzed during his career was John A. Koyle's Relief Mine, also known as the Dream Mine. Koyle's mine began in Spanish Fork, Utah in the 1890s and was formally incorporated as a business in 1909. Koyle had allegedly prophesied that the mine would offer the LDS Church resources during times of crisis. Many local residents invested in the mine's stock, believing Koyle's prophecies that the mine contained valuable materials. Talmage assessed the mine's production in 1913 and determined it was worthless.

== LDS Church writings and service ==
=== Religious literary works ===
Talmage was the author of several religious books, including The Articles of Faith, The Great Apostasy, The House of the Lord, and Jesus the Christ. These volumes remain in print and are still widely read in the LDS Church. In 1905, the church's First Presidency requested Talmage write the book that would come to be known as Jesus the Christ. They requested he compile his lectures about the life of Jesus Christ into a book that would be widely available to church members and other readers. At that time, Talmage had many responsibilities with his church callings, his family, and his profession that kept him from starting the book but nearly ten years later, following another request from the First Presidency, he started writing Jesus the Christ. The significance that was placed on the writing of this book about the life of Christ is seen in the First Presidency's setting aside space in the Salt Lake Temple for Talmage to work on the book uninterrupted and without distractions. Jesus the Christ was published in September 1915, just under one year after Talmage started writing it.

In 1911, the First Presidency learned that a man named Max Florence, a former theater owner in Salt Lake City, had gained unauthorized access to the Salt Lake Temple. He had taken numerous photographs of the interior and was holding those photographs for ransom, but the church president at that time, Joseph F. Smith, would not negotiate with Florence on the subject. Florence said that he would sell the pictures to anyone who named a high enough price. A few days after this news was publicized, Talmage suggested to the First Presidency that they commission their own photographs of the Salt Lake Temple and publicize them as a book of photos. Smith authorized Talmage to get the pictures and also write on the subject of the temple to accompany the publication of the photographs. The House of the Lord was completed and published shortly thereafter in 1912.

=== Church service ===
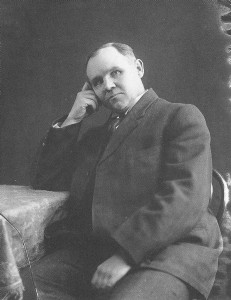
Talmage around the time of his call to the Quorum of the Twelve Apostles

Before he became a member of the Quorum of the Twelve Apostles, Talmage was an alternate high councilor in the Utah Stake of Zion. He became a member of the Quorum of the Twelve Apostles on 7 December 1911, after Charles W. Penrose was appointed as second counselor in the First Presidency. Additionally, from 1924 to 1928, Talmage served as president of the church's European Mission.

== Views on science and religion ==
Talmage was an attentive student and teacher of science, but he did not believe there was conflict between science and religion and did not worry about differences or discrepancies between the two fields of thought. He believed that with time and continued learning, these discrepancies would eventually be resolved. He had confidence in the scientific method and was able to accept scientific discoveries and findings supported by it while still holding fast to his religious beliefs. His views on science and religion are demonstrated by this statement: "Within the Gospel of Jesus Christ there is room for every truth thus far learned by man, or yet to be made known."

Talmage's views on science and religion can also be seen through an event that took place in 1929. In that year, B. H. Roberts, a scientific scholar and LDS Church leader, presented a 700-page manuscript to the First Presidency which attempted to completely align theology and science. Other church leaders were concerned with what was written in this manuscript and disagreed with the claims about evolution represented. Joseph Fielding Smith, then a member of the Quorum of the Twelve Apostles, made a statement against what was written about evolution in the manuscript prepared by Roberts. Talmage tried to mediate between Smith and Roberts, suggesting to the First Presidency that they come out with a statement of neutrality on the issue, which they did. They soon came out with a statement stating that neither side of the argument was accepted as church doctrine.

== Political involvement ==
Almost immediately after his return to Provo, Utah after his schooling in the East, Talmage was asked to run for the office of Territorial Superintendent of Schools by the People's Party. He could not accept due to his recent appointment as the first counselor in the presidency of BYA. Additionally, he was ineligible to run for office since he was not a United States citizen. Soon, he applied for citizenship and received his naturalization papers and although he was uninterested in political involvement aside from necessity, Talmage went on to serve on the Provo City Council as an alderman, and as a justice of the peace.

== Death ==
Talmage died on 27 July 1933 in Salt Lake City at age 70. He was buried at Salt Lake City Cemetery. The vacancy in the Quorum of the Twelve created by his death was filled by Charles Albert Callis.

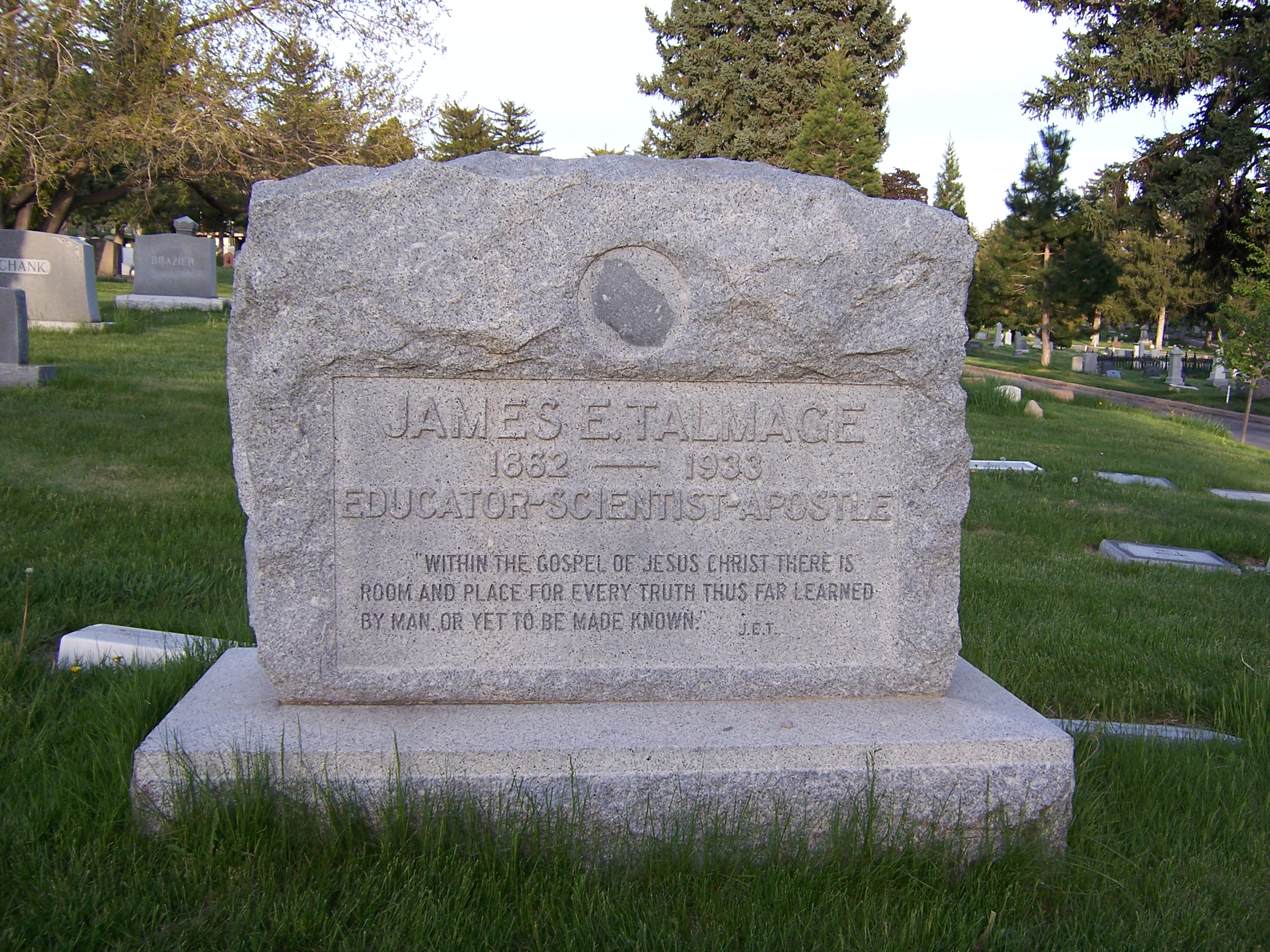
Grave marker of James E. Talmage

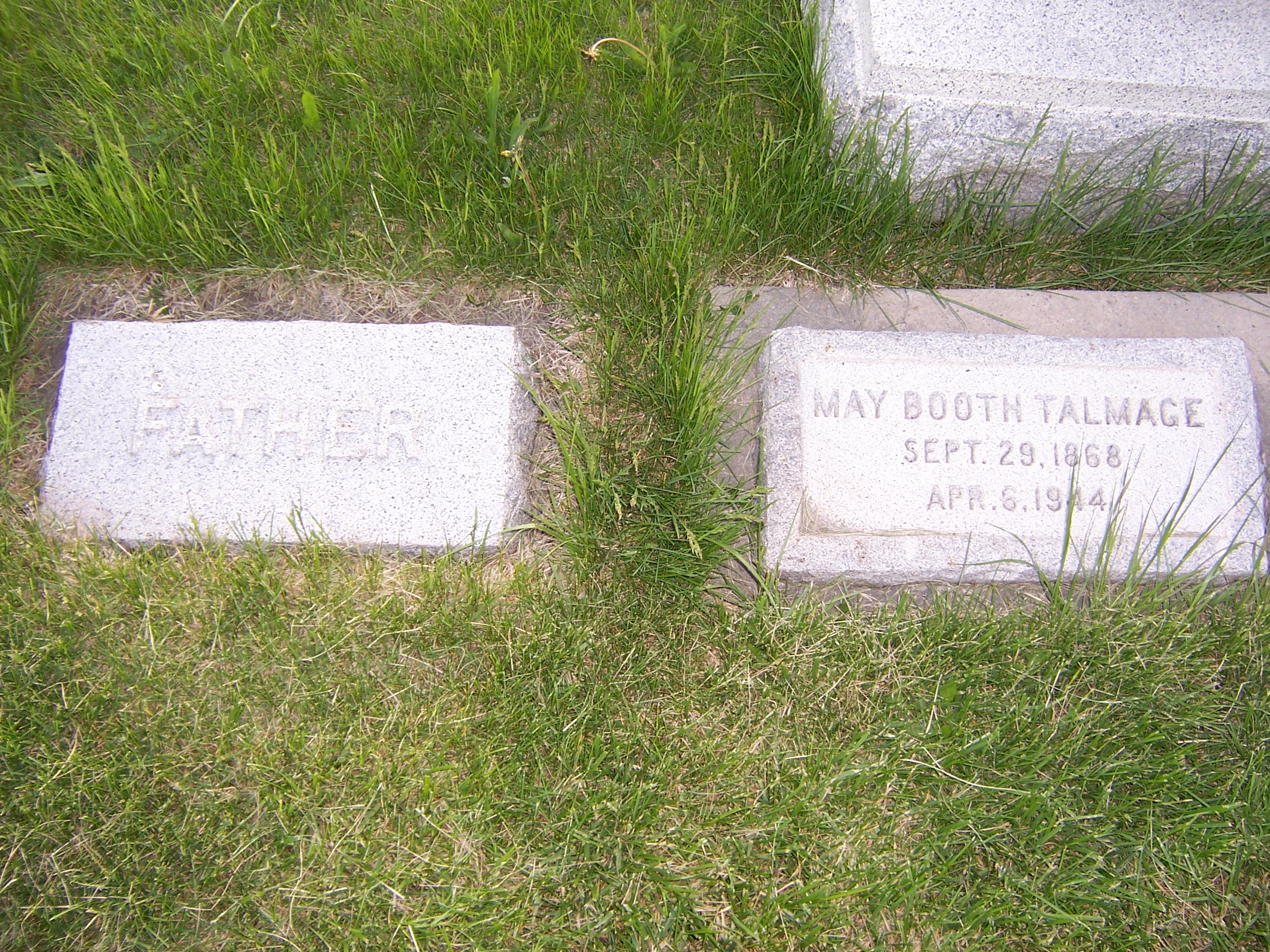
Headstone of James E. Talmage

== Personal life ==
In 1888, Talmage married Merry May Booth (1868–1944), on 14 June 1888. Booth was a native of Alpine, Utah, and the daughter of immigrants from Lancashire. She started studies at the normal school connected with BYA in 1885, when she was 16. It was there she met Talmage, who was one of her instructors. While at BYA, Booth was secretary of the Polysophical Society. After completing her course of normal study, May took a job as a teacher in Kaysville, Utah. A few months later, Talmage undertook a project to study the waters of the Great Salt Lake; Talmage's main reason for this journey, though, was to pursue a relationship with Booth, and five months later they were married in Manti, Utah.

The Talmages had eight children. Among their children was John Russell Talmage (1911 - 2001), who wrote a biography of his father entitled "The Talmage Story: Life of James E. Talmage - Educator, Scientist, Apostle" (1972). Another of their children, Sterling B. Talmage (1889–1956) became a geologist.

== Legacy ==
The Mathematics and Computer Sciences Building at Brigham Young University is named after James Talmage. The University of Utah College of Science is housed in the James E. Talmage Building.

== Published works ==
- Talmage, James E. (1888). First Book of Nature. Salt Lake City, Utah: The Contributor Company.
- —— (1891). Domestic Science: A Book For Use in Schools and For General Reading. Salt Lake City, Utah: The Juvenile Instructor Office.
- —— (1898). Tables for Blowpipe Examination of Minerals. Salt Lake City, Utah: Tribune Job Printing Company.
- —— (1899). The Articles of Faith: A Series of Lectures on the Principal Doctrines of The Church of Jesus Christ of Latter-day Saints. Salt Lake City, Utah: The Deseret News.
- —— (1900). The Great Salt Lake, Present and Past. Salt Lake City, Utah: The Deseret News.
- —— (1909). The Great Apostasy Considered in the Light of Scriptural and Secular History. Salt Lake City, Utah: The Deseret News.
- —— (1920). The Story of "Mormonism". Salt Lake City, Utah: The Deseret News.
- —— (1912). The House of the Lord: A Study of Holy Sanctuaries Ancient and Modern. Salt Lake City, Utah: The Church of Jesus Christ of Latter-day Saints.
- —— (1914). The Philosophy of Mormonism. Salt Lake City, Utah: The Deseret News.
- —— (1915). Jesus the Christ: A Study of the Messiah and His Mission according to Holy Scriptures both Ancient and Modern. Salt Lake City, Utah: The Deseret News.
- —— (1917). The Vitality of "Mormonism": An Address. Salt Lake City, Utah: The Deseret News.
- —— (1930). Latter-day Revelation: Selections from the Book of Doctrine and Covenants of the Church of Jesus Christ of Latter-day Saints. Salt Lake City, Utah: The Church of Jesus Christ of Latter-day Saints.
- —— (1930). Sunday Night Talks: A Series of Radio Addresses Relating to Doctrines of the Church of Jesus Christ of Latter-day Saints. Salt Lake City, Utah: The Church of Jesus Christ of Latter-day Saints.
- —— (1973). Zobell, Albert L. (ed.). The Parables of James E. Talmage. Salt Lake City, Utah: Deseret Book Company. ISBN 0877474958.
- —— (1997). Harris, James P. (ed.). The Essential James E. Talmage. Salt Lake City, Utah: Signature Books. ISBN 1560850183.

== See also ==
- Mormonism and evolution

The Church of Jesus Christ of Latter-day Saints titles
| Preceded by Joseph Fielding Smith | Quorum of the Twelve Apostles; 8 December 1911 – 27 July 1933 | Succeeded by Stephen L Richards |
Academic offices
| Preceded by Joseph T. Kingsbury | President of the University of Utah; 1894–1897 | Succeeded by Joseph T. Kingsbury |
| Preceded by Willard Done (acting principal) | Principal of Salt Lake Academy; 1888–1892 | Succeeded by Willard Done |
