= Especially for Youth =

Youth seminar organized by The Church of Jesus Christ of Latter-day Saints

- Frequency: Weekly during summer months
- Inaugurated: 1976
- Most recent: Beginning in 2022, also facilitates FSY conferences
- Participants: 50,000+ yearly
- Patron: The Church of Jesus Christ of Latter-day Saints

Especially For Youth (often abbreviated as EFY) is a week-long youth-oriented seminar focused on fellowship and teaching the principles of the Church of Jesus Christ of Latter-day Saints (LDS Church). It is run by Brigham Young University's (BYU) Division of Continuing Education (CE) and is the largest church-oriented summer camp, attracting over 50,000 attendees every year at locations around the world.

== Structure ==
Attendance is open to all youth aged fourteen to eighteen. Sessions, which are primarily held in the United States, follow a common curriculum created by members of the LDS Church. Sessions take place during the summer months in order to coincide with the summer break practiced by many schools. The program is led by Latter-day Saint young adults who serve as counselors for the youth during the sessions. Many of the speakers are selected from the LDS Church's Seminary and Institute program or from the faculty of BYU and its sister institutions in Idaho and Hawaii. All sessions in the United States and Canada are organized and managed by the EFY office on the BYU campus in Provo, Utah, where it is part of BYU's CE, with sessions elsewhere organized by local organizing committees and area authorities.

EFY states that its mission is to help participants "come unto Christ."

== History of EFY ==
EFY was created by Ronald C. Hills in 1976 when 172 youth and 15 counselors met for the first session of the summer program. Then-Commissioner of Church Education Jeffrey R. Holland, now of the Quorum of the Twelve Apostles, was one of the banquet speakers at the founding session. The next year, attendance rose to 863 youth. As of 2005, the total number of participants who had attended EFY over the years was 409,484. John Bytheway wrote his master's thesis at BYU on the early years of EFY. In 1999, Michael R. Hicks composed "The EFY Medley," which up to 2012 became one of the main songs sung at every session of EFY. As of August 2012, JD Hucks was the current program director.

=== Global expansion ===
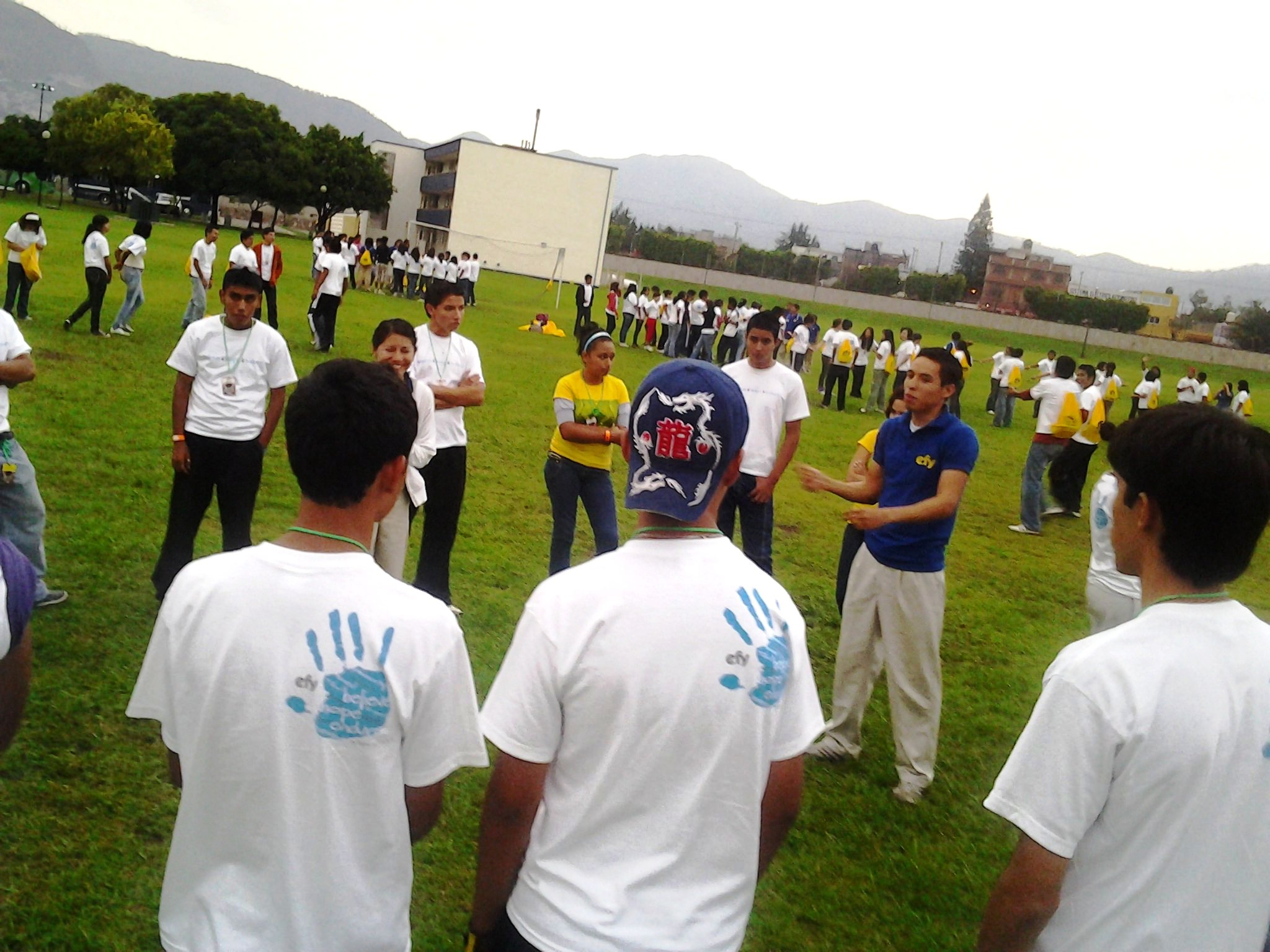
Home Evening Games the first day of EFY México-León 2011

Between 2006 and 2011, the EFY program expanded to more parts of the world. In 2006, EFY expanded outside of the United States and Canada for the first time, with sessions in England, Germany, Mexico, and Sweden. Further expansion followed in 2009, with EFY sessions held for the first time in Spain, Italy, France and Guatemala. In 2010, the first EFY sessions were held in Australia, New Zealand, Portugal, Cape Verde, Norway, Netherlands, Tahiti, El Salvador, and Honduras. Puerto Rico hosted an EFY session in 2011.

=== For the Strength of Youth Conferences ===
Beginning in 2012 most international locations began holding For the Strength of Youth (FSY) conferences, which were organized through local area presidencies, rather than through BYU. Then, after implementation initially being delayed from 2020 by the COVID-19 pandemic, in 2022, EFY started facilitating FSY conferences more broadly as a standard part of the LDS Church's youth program.

== Locations of EFY ==
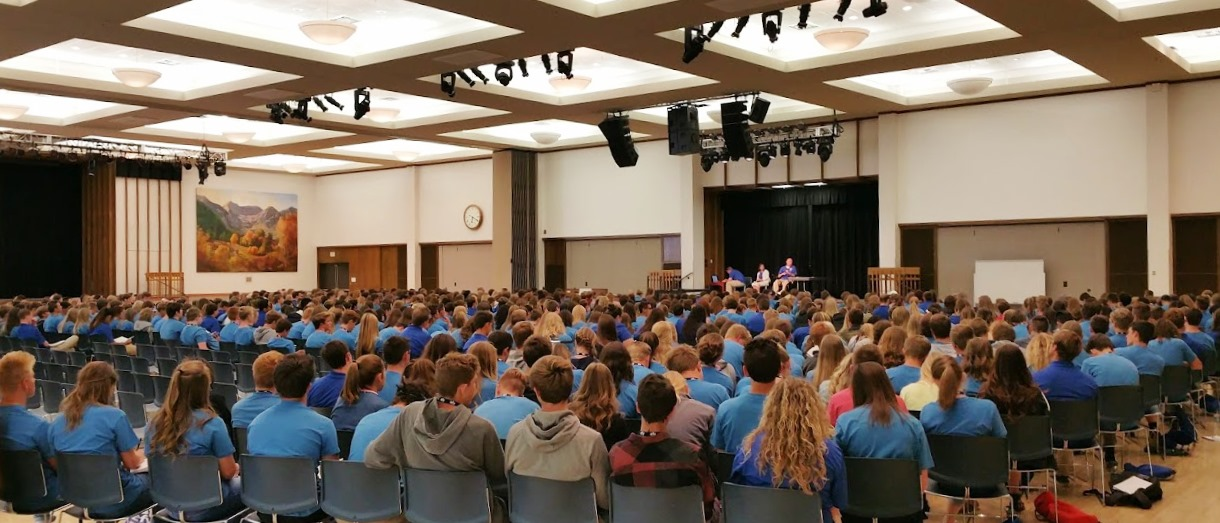
EFY participants gather to listen to speakers in June 2017 on the BYU campus

The traditional overnight-stay EFY programs are normally held on college campuses. BYU is the largest destination, hosting about 13,000 participants each summer. In some limited situations EFY has been held in a hotel rather than on a university campus. The stay-at-home programs which do not involve overnight accommodations are often held at local church stake centers.

Sessions of EFY have been held in the following nations:

- Australia
- Canada
- Cape Verde
- Denmark
- Finland
- France
- Guatemala
- Germany
- Italy
- Mexico
- The Netherlands
- New Zealand
- Norway
- Portugal
- South Korea
- Spain
- Sweden
- Tahiti
- United Kingdom
- United States
- Argentina
- El Salvador
- Honduras
- Chile

There are also a number of nations that haven't hosted an EFY session, but have been invited to participate in sessions in other nations. These nations include:

- Ireland: As of 2009, officially participated within sessions held in the United Kingdom.
- Austria/Switzerland: Officially participate within the session held in Germany in 2010.
- Iceland/Denmark/Sweden: Officially participate within the session held in Norway in 2010.
- Belgium: (Dutch speaking) Officially participate with the session held in the Netherlands in 2010 and 2012.

EFY sessions in Latin America began in Guatemala in 2009 and are now running as FSY conferences in the Central America region, Mexico and other South American countries. FSY conferences are officially sanctioned and run by the LDS Church.

- Brazil

== EFY yearly themes ==
In 1982, EFY introduced its first annual theme. Since then, a theme and a scripture have set the tone for each EFY Session. In 2018 they have done LDS church related talks that also set the tone.

- 1982: The Time Has Come
- 1983: Ascending Together
- 1984: Discovering New Horizons
- 1985: Let Your Light Shine
- 1986: Lovin' Life
- 1987: Sailin' Home
- 1988: Win the Race
- 1989: Forever, My Friend
- 1990: Learning For Myself
- 1991: Walk With Me
- 1992: Of One Heart
- 1993: Sharing the Light
- 1994: Serving With Strength
- 1995: Return With Honor
- 1996: Living the Legacy
- 1997: Treasure the Truth
- 1998: Joy in the Journey
- 1999: A Season for Courage
- 2000: Forward With Faith
- 2001: Remember the Promise
- 2002: We Believe
- 2003: Look and Live
- 2004: Stand in the Light
- 2005: A More Excellent Way
- 2006: The Greatest Gift
- 2007: Power In Purity
- 2008: Steady and Sure
- 2009: Be Thou An Example
- 2010: Courage to Stand Strong
- 2011: Believe. Hope. Endure.
- 2012: Arise and Shine Forth
- 2013: Firm in the Faith
- 2014: Anxiously Engaged
- 2015: Here Am I
- 2016: What Matters Most
- 2017: The Way to Become
- 2018: Choose Joy
- 2019: Trust With All Thine Heart
- 2020: Online due to Covid-19
- 2021: A Witness Of My Own
- 2022: Trust in the Lord
- 2023: My Peace I Give Unto You
- 2024: One by One
- 2025: Rejoice Together (50th Anniversary)

== EFY schedule ==
Each day follows a schedule of devotionals, gospel study, session director morningsides, journal time, and personal scripture study. There are little if any changes between each of the nations who hold sessions of EFY, mostly in the schedule of the Overnight and Stay-at-Home program.

Schedule changes have been made over the years. In the late 1990s the schedule involved three dances (on Monday, Wednesday and Friday) and it also involved scheduled exercise time each morning. There have also been various shortened versions offered, at times involving a three-day schedule and currently there is the EFY Express which involves a one-day program. Since the EFY Express one-day programs all occur within a day they can be held during the school year.

Overnight Program - Overview of Week
Time	Monday	Tuesday	Wednesday	Thursday	Friday	Saturday
Morning	Counselor/Coordinators Preparations	Classes	Classes	Young Men/Young Women Activity	For the Strength of Youth Activity	Checkout
Afternoon	Registration; Meet Your Counselor; Meet Your Company; Orientation	Classes; Variety Show Tryouts/Musical Rehearsal/Free Time	Classes; Variety Show Tryouts/Musical Rehearsal/Free Time	Variety Show; Musical Dress Rehearsal/Free Time	Service Activity; Free Time	
Evening	Session Director Devotional; FHE Games and Goal Setting	Dance Etiquette and Instruction; Dance	Banner and Cheer Preparations; Games and Cheer-Off; Pizza Night	Testimony Tips; Fireside/Musical Program; Testimony Meeting	Picture/Address Exchange; Dance; Slide Show "Taking it Home"	

== Adventure-based sister programs ==
BYU–Idaho hosts three EFY-like programs that encompass a significant outdoors component. These programs include Adventure for Youth, Outdoor Youth Adventures, and Youth for Excellence.
