= Jesus the Christ (book) =

1915 book by James E. Talmage

Jesus the Christ: A Study of the Messiah and His Mission According to the Holy Scriptures Both Ancient and Modern
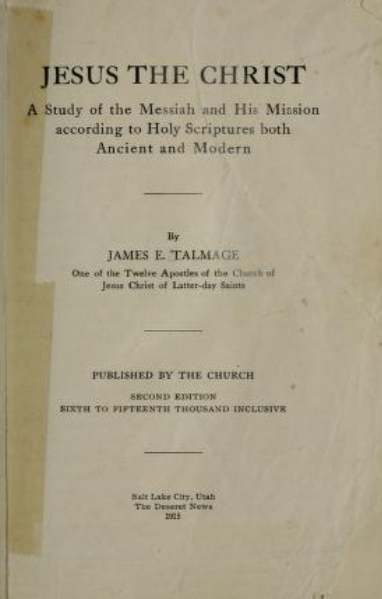
- Author: James E. Talmage
- Publication date: 1915

Jesus the Christ: A Study of the Messiah and His Mission According to the Holy Scriptures Both Ancient and Modern is a 1915 book by James E. Talmage. The book is a doctrinal study on the life and ministry of Jesus Christ and is widely appreciated by members of the Church of Jesus Christ of Latter-day Saints (LDS Church). The book consists of 42 chapters, each focusing on important aspects of the life and mission of Jesus as the Messiah.

== History ==
Since it was first published on September 15, 1915, Jesus the Christ has been viewed by the LDS Church as a classic text on its teachings and beliefs concerning the life and ministry of Jesus. Marion G. Romney said, "One who gets the understanding, the vision, and the spirit of the resurrected Lord through a careful study of the text Jesus the Christ by Elder James E. Talmage will find that he has greatly increased his moving faith in our glorified Redeemer."

In his preface to the first edition, Talmage wrote: "The author has departed from the course usually followed by writers on the Life of Jesus Christ, which course, as a rule, begins with the birth of Mary's Babe and ends with the ascension of the slain and risen Lord from Olivet. The treatment embodied in these pages, in addition to the narrative of the Lord's life in the flesh, comprises the antemortal existence and activities of the world's Redeemer, the revelations and personal manifestations of the glorified and exalted Son of God during the apostolic period of old and in modern times, the assured nearness of the Lord's second advent, and predicted events beyond—all so far as the Holy Scriptures make it plain. It is particularly congruous and appropriate that The Church of Jesus Christ of Latter-day Saints—the only Church that affirms authority based on specific revelation and commission to use the Lord's Holy Name as a distinctive designation—should set forth her doctrines concerning the Messiah and His mission."

== Acceptance and publication ==
Talmage first presented his study on the Savior as a series of lectures delivered under the auspices of the Deseret Sunday School Union Board at the LDS University in Salt Lake City from September 1904 to April 1906. He was subsequently asked by the church's First Presidency to publish the lectures in book form. Because of other commitments, he was unable to complete this assignment for several years.

On December 8, 1911, Talmage was ordained a member of the Quorum of the Twelve Apostles of the LDS Church. Less than three years later he was able to continue his work on the manuscript, writing in longhand, in a council room on the fourth floor of the Salt Lake Temple (known today as the Talmage Room). As chapters were completed, he presented them to the First Presidency, members of the Twelve, and Sunday School board members.

In his journal, under the date of April 19, 1915, Talmage wrote: "Finished the actual writing on the book "Jesus the Christ", to which I have devoted every spare hour since settling down to the work of composition on September 14th last. Had it not been that I was privileged to do this work in the Temple it would be at present far from completion. I have felt the inspiration of the place and have appreciated the privacy and quietness incident thereto. I hope to proceed with the work of revision without delay."

Published a century ago and translated into many languages, Jesus the Christ has become a classic volume in Mormon literature. It remains part of the "approved missionary library"; that is, it is one of the few non-scriptural works that Mormon missionaries are encouraged to read.

== Editions ==
- Talmage, James E. (1915). Jesus the Christ: A Study of the Messiah and His Mission According to the Holy Scriptures Both Ancient and Modern. Deseret News. LCCN 52056531. OCLC 3257868..
- Talmage, James E. (1922). Jesus the Christ: A Study of the Messiah and His Mission according to Holy Scriptures both Ancient and Modern (6th ed.). The Church of Jesus Christ of Latter-day Saints – via Project Gutenberg.
- Talmage, James E. (2006). Jesus the Christ: A Study of the Messiah and His Mission according to Holy Scriptures both Ancient and Modern. The Church of Jesus Christ of Latter-day Saints.
