= List of Book of Mormon places =

This list is intended as a quick reference for locations mentioned in the Book of Mormon.

- See also

== A ==
- City of Aaron, Alma^{2}'s planned destination after rejection in Ammonihah. Later fortified by Moroni^{1} through the creation of new cities Moroni and Nephihah.
- Ablom, east of the Hill of Shim, near the seashore, and a refuge for king Omer and his family as they escaped Akish and his secret combinations.
- Plains of Agosh, Jaredite battle site where the wicked king Lib^{2} fought Coriantumr^{2} and lost his life.
- Aiath (/ˈaɪəθ/), Biblical city mentioned by Isaiah, as quoted by Nephi^{1}. Also known as Ai or Aija, and likely located in the tribal land of Benjamin, near Jerusalem. The archaeological site associated with ancient Ai is often identified as Et-Tell.
- Wilderness of Akish, Jaredite land into which Gilead fled, and battled Coriantumr^{2}. At a later time, the army of Coriantumr^{2} fled to the same location after losing to Lib^{2}.
- Valley of Alma, rest stop for Alma^{1} and his followers as they fled from Noahite priest Amulon and the land of Helam.
- City and Land of Ammonihah, wicked Nephite city that reviled Alma^{2} and Amulon, imprisoned them, and suffered destruction when prison walls were broken. Later attacked and utterly destroyed by Lamanites. Associated with desolation of Nehors. Partially rebuilt at a later time. Located three days north of the Land of Melek.
- Hill Amnihu, site of the initial Amlicite strike. Located east of the River Sidon.
- Land of Amulon, settled by Amulon and priests, between Zarahemla and Nephi
- Anathoth, city adjacent to and just north of Jerusalem, mentioned by Isaiah, as quoted by Nephi^{1}. Notable as the hometown of the prophet Jeremiah.
- Angola, retreat for Mormon's army
- Ani-Anti, Lamanite village visited by Nephite missionaries
- Land of Antionum, home of Zoramites, and visited by Nephite missionaries
- Antiparah, city captured by Lamanites and regained by Helaman and Antipus
- Mount Antipas, gathering place for Lehonti and the peaceful Lamanites
- Land of Antum (/ˈæntəm/), northern land visited by Mormon and Ammoron
- Arpad, Biblical location mentioned by Isaiah, as quoted by Nephi^{1}. Located in northern Syria, near Aleppo. Historically, Arpad played a significant role in the region due to its strategic position. It is currently called Tel Rifaat.
- Assyria, country in western Asia

== B ==
- Babylon, Biblical capital of Babylonia, in southwest Asia, the Jewish captivity into which was prophesied by Lehi.
- Bashan, country east of the Jordan river
- Bethabara, Biblical site on the east bank of the Jordan River, where John the Baptist preached and conducted baptisms, as prophesied by Lehi.
- Boaz, Nephite retreat and battle ground
- City of Bountiful, major Nephite city in the northeastern quadrant
- Land of Bountiful¹, area in southern Arabia, near sea
- Land of Bountiful², Nephite territory north of Zarahemla

== C ==
- Calno (/ˈkælnoʊ/), Biblical location mentioned by Isaiah, as quoted by Nephi^{1}. Sometimes identified with the ancient city of Calneh, and believed to be located in northern Mesopotamia. One of the likely candidates for ancient Calneh is the site known today as Kullan-Köy, near the city of Ar-Raqqah in modern Syria.
- Carchemish, Biblical location mentioned by Isaiah, as quoted by Nephi^{1}. Located in what is today southeastern Turkey, near the Syrian border. It was particularly famous for the Battle of Carchemish in 605 BC, where the Babylonian army under Nebuchadnezzar II decisively defeated the Egyptian and Assyrian forces, leading to Babylonian dominance over much of the ancient Near East.
- Chaldea, Hellenistic designation for a part of Babylonia
- City by the Sea, Nephite city on the west coast
- Hill Comnor, hill near Valley of Shur
- Land and Valley of Corihor, military campground of the army of Shiz
- City of Cumeni, Nephite city fought for by Helaman
- Hill Cumorah, meeting place for battle, record depository

== D ==
- Damascus, Biblical capital of the Aramean kingdom, mentioned by Isaiah, as quoted by Nephi^{1}. Located in present-day Syria, Damascus frequently conflicted with both the northern kingdom of Israel and the southern kingdom of Judah. The fall of Damascus to the Assyrians under King Tiglath-Pileser III around 732 BC was a significant event in the regional power dynamics, effectively ending the independence of the Aramean kingdom and marking the expansion of Assyrian control.
- Land of David, Nephite land on the west coast
- City of Desolation, northern Nephite city
- Land of Desolation, north of the land Bountiful

== E ==
- Garden of Eden, original home of Adam and Eve
- Edom, arid region in southwest Israel
- Egypt, land of Israel's captivity
- Elam, one of the oldest recorded civilizations
- Hill Ephraim, hill in the northern region

== F ==
- Land of First Inheritance, near the Lehites' original landing point

== G ==
- City of Gad (/ɡæd/), city destroyed at the crucifixion
- City of Gadiandi (/ˌɡædiˈændaɪ/), city destroyed at the crucifixion
- City of Gadiomnah (/ˌɡædiˈɒmnə/), city destroyed at the crucifixion
- Gallim (/ˈɡælɪm/), Biblical city mentioned by Isaiah, as quoted by Nephi^{1}. Probably in Benjamin, to the north of Jerusalem.
- Geba, Biblical city mentioned by Isaiah, as quoted by Nephi^{1}. Archaeological evidence and biblical texts together help locate Geba near the modern village of Jaba', which lies northeast of Jerusalem.
- Gibeah, Biblical city mentioned by Isaiah, as quoted by Nephi^{1}. Hometown and capital of King Saul, located just north of Jerusalem.
- Gebim (/ˈɡiːbɪm/), location near Jerusalem mentioned by Isaiah, as quoted by Nephi^{1}. The name means "cisterns" or "pits" in Hebrew, suggesting that it was known for water sources or storage.
- City of Gid, city invaded by Lamanites and used as a prison camp to detain Nephites
- City of Gideon, suburb of Zarahemla, location of battle, preaching, and other events
- Land and Valley of Gideon, east of river Sidon
- City of Gilgal, city destroyed at the crucifixion
- Valley of Gilgal, Jaredite battle region
- City of Gimgimno (/ɡɪmˈɡɪmnoʊ/), city destroyed at the crucifixion
- Gomorrah, wicked city of the old world

== H ==
- Hagoth, Hagoth's shipbuilding site
- Hamath, Biblical location mentioned by Isaiah, as quoted by Nephi^{1}. Located on the Orontes River in modern-day Syria and one of the major cities of ancient Syria. Often mentioned as a northern boundary of the Israelite territories, expressed in the phrase "from Dan to Beersheba, and from the sea to Hamath."
- Land of Helam, land eight days into the wilderness, found and settled by people of Alma^{1}.
- Hermounts (/ˈhɜːrmaʊnts/), wilderness on west and north
- Plains of Heshlon (/ˈhɛʃlɒn/), battleground of Coriantum and Shared
- Land of Heth (/hɛθ/), land in the northern region
- Horeb, mountains on the Sinai Peninsula

== I ==
- Irreantum, (/ˌɪriˈæntəm/),
- Land of Ishmael, portion of land of Nephi
- Israel, promised land of Moses' people

== J ==
- City of Jacob, city destroyed at the crucifixion
- Jacobugath (/ˌdʒeɪkəˈbuːɡæθ/), city of followers of Jacob
- City and Land of Jashon, Nephite retreat near Ammoron's record burial site
- Land of Jershon (/ˈdʒɛərʃɒn/), land on east by sea, south of land Bountiful. First mentioned when people of Ammon, seeking protection from fellow Lamanites, resettled there about 76 BC (Alma 27:22-24). Because of the threat of war from the Zoramites in Antionum to the south, Ammonites were relocated to Melek about 73 BC. All references to Jershon come from this three- to four-year period.
- Jerusalem¹, chief city of Jews and its surrounding area, original home of Lehi's family.
- Jerusalem², Lamanite city and land in land of Nephi
- Jordan River, river in Palestine
- City of Jordan, Nephite retreat maintained by Mormon
- City of Josh, city destroyed at the crucifixion
- Land of Joshua, land in borders west, by seashore
- Judah, southern kingdom of Israelites
- City of Judea, Nephite city

== K ==
- City of Kishkumen, Wicked city destroyed at the crucifixion

== L ==
- Laish, city located in the northernmost part of ancient Israel, mentioned by Isaiah, as quoted by Nephi^{1}. Also known as Leshem before being captured and renamed Dan by the tribe of Dan.
- City of Laman, City destroyed at the crucifixion
- River Laman, River emptying into Red Sea
- Lebanon, the historical Phoenicia, middle eastern country directly north of Israel, the fall of which was prophesied by Isaiah, as quoted by Nephi^{1}.
- City of and Land of Lehi¹, Land adjoining land of Morianton and containing city of Lehi
- Land of Lehi², Apparently the entire land south
- City of and Land of Lehi-Nephi, Also called land of Nephi, of which it is a part
- City of Lemuel, Lamanite city
- Valley of Lemuel, Lehite campsite near borders of Red Sea

== M ==
- Madmenah, location near Jerusalem, mentioned by Isaiah, as quoted by Nephi^{1}. Likely within the tribal lands of Benjamin near the ancient Kingdom of Judah.
- City of Manti, chief city in land of Manti
- Hill of Manti, near city of Zarahemla
- Land of Manti, most southerly land of Nephites
- Melek (/ˈmiːlɛk/), Nephite land west of Sidon
- Michmash, Biblical city mentioned by Isaiah, as quoted by Nephi^{1}. Town of Benjamin east of Bethel, generally identified with the modern-day village of Mukhmas.
- Middoni (/mɪˈdoʊnaɪ/), Lamanite land, location of Lamanite prison
- Midian^{1}, Biblical region and people, mentioned by Isaiah, as quoted by Nephi^{1}. Located primarily in what is now northwestern Saudi Arabia, southern Jordan, southern Israel, and the Sinai Peninsula.
- Land of Midian^{2} (/ˈmɪdiən/), Lamanite land east of Lehi-Nephi
- Migron (/ˈmaɪɡrɒn/), Biblical city mentioned by Isaiah, as quoted by Nephi^{1}. Likely situated in the territory of the tribe of Benjamin, north of Jerusalem, probably a small outpost or settlement.
- Minon (/ˈmaɪnɒn/), Nephite land on west bank of river Sidon
- Moab, land of the Moabites, Israelite rivals
- City of Mocum (/ˈmoʊkəm/), city destroyed at the crucifixion
- Moriancumer, Mesopotamian coastal region
- City of and Land of Morianton, area settled by Morianton²
- Moriantum (/ˌmɒriˈæntəm/), Nephite area
- Forest of Mormon, near waters of Mormon
- Place of Mormon, region near city of Lehi-Nephi
- Waters of Mormon, baptismal waters for over 200 Nephites
- Land of Moron, north of the great land of Desolation
- Moroni's Camp, Nephite military post
- City of and Land of Moroni, in southeast of Nephite lands
- City of Moronihah, iniquitous Nephite city
- City of Mulek, Nephite city south of Bountiful

== N ==
- Nahom, location in Arabian desert
- Land of Naphtali, Israelite territory
- Narrow Neck, near west sea, which led into the land northward
- Narrow Pass, led by the sea into the land northward
- Narrow Strip of Wilderness, ran from the sea east to the sea west
- Nazareth, city of Christ's childhood
- City of Nehor, battleground for Corihor and Shule
- City of Nephi, city established by Nephi, later occupied by Lamanites, Zeniffites
- Land of Nephi, land established by Nephi, later occupied by Lamanites, Zeniffites
- City of Nephihah, Nephite refuge captured and lost by the Lamanites
- Plains of Nephihah, near the city of Nephihah
- Nephite Refuge, location for Nephite centralization
- Valley of Nimrod, in Mesopotamia
- Nob, city north of Jerusalem, within the ancient kingdom of Judah, mentioned by Isaiah, as quoted by Nephi^{1}.
- City and Land of Noah, in land of Zarahemla, near Ammonihah. It was here, in 72 BC by the Nephite calendar, that the Lamanites, under the command of Lamanite king Amalickiah, attacked the Nephites. No Nephites died, but over a thousand Lamanites died, including all their chief captains.

== O ==
- Ogath, (/ˈoʊɡæθ/), place near hill Ramah
- City of Omner, Nephite city by seashore on east borders
- Onidah (/oʊˈnaɪdə/), gathering place for dissatisfied Lamanites
- Hill Onidah (/oʊˈnaɪdə/), in land of Antionum
- Onihah (/oʊˈnaɪhə/), city destroyed at the crucifixion
- Rock of Oreb, Biblical location mentioned by Isaiah, as quoted by Nephi^{1}. Landmark associated with a specific event where the Midianite leaders, Oreb and Zeeb, were defeated and killed by the Israelites.

== P ==
- Palestina, middle eastern land neighboring Israel
- Pathros, location in upper Egypt

== R ==
- Hill Ramah (/ˈrɑːmə/), Jaredite name for Hill Cumorah
- Ramath (/ˈreɪməθ/), (also spelled Ramah), Biblical city mentioned by Isaiah, as quoted by Nephi^{1}. Likely located in the territory of the tribe of Benjamin, north of Jerusalem, and destroyed by divine decree.
- Hill Riplah (/ˈrɪplə/), east of river Sidon, near land of Manti
- Waters of Ripliancum (/ˌrɪpliˈænkəm/), aquatic region in the land northward

== S ==
- Salem (/ˈseɪlɛm/), ancient name for Jerusalem
- Samaria, Biblical location mentioned by Isaiah, as quoted by Nephi^{1}. Capital city of the northern Kingdom of Israel that played a significant role in the region's history until it fell to the Assyrians in 722 BC. Located in the hill country of Ephraim (central to what is now the Northern West Bank), Samaria was strategically positioned atop a hill, providing natural defenses.
- Waters of Sebus, (/ˈsiːbəs/), watering place in land of Ishmael
- Shazer (/ˈʃeɪzər/), Lehite rest stop in Arabia
- Shelem (/ˈʃiːlɛm/), mountain in Mesopotamia
- City of and Land of Shem², Nephite land north of Antum and Jashon
- Land of Shemlon, (/ˈʃɛmlɒn/), Region bordering on land of Lehi-Nephi
- Sherrizah, (/ʃɛˈraɪzə/), Nephite stronghold conquered by Lamanites
- Waters of Shiloah, (/ʃaɪˈloʊə/), pool near Jerusalem^{1}
- City of and Land of Shilom (/ˈʃaɪləm/), small region next to land of Lehi-Nephi
- Hill Shim, hill in the land northward
- Shimnilom, (/ʃɪmˈnaɪlɒm/), city in the land of Nephi
- Shinar, ancient name for Mesopotamia
- Valley of Shurr, /ʃɜːr/), Coriantumr's base camp
- Land of Sidom, (/ˈsaɪdəm/), city near Ammonihah where Zeezrom, Alma and Amulek retreated
- Sidon River, major river flowing through the land of Zarahemla
- Mount Sinai, mountain where Moses received the ten commandments
- Sinim, (/ˈsaɪnɪm/), distant land, possibly China
- Siron, (/ˈsaɪrən/), city near Antionum where Corianton met Isabel
- Sodom, wicked city of the old world
- Syria, middle Eastern country

== T ==
- Tarshish, possibly the city Tarsus
- City of Teancum, by seashore near city of Desolation
- Tower of Babel, near original home of the Jaredites

== W ==
- Wilderness, various places, described in the Book of Mormon in the following order:
  - Wilderness by the borders of the Red Sea, into which Lehi first took his family as they left Jerusalem (c. 600 BC).
  - Wilderness of John the Baptist, where he preached and conducted baptisms, as prophesied by Lehi. Typically identified as the region along the Jordan River (and particularly, Bethabara), stretching from the Sea of Galilee in the north to the Dead Sea in the south.
  - Wilderness of Irreantum, large area of southern Arabia through which the party of Lehi travelled eastward for eight years before stopping their journey at the edge of the sea, which site they called Bountiful.
  - Wilderness of the Land of Promise, first landing site of the Lehite party in the new world (c. 588 BC).
  - Wilderness of Moses, Biblical land between the Red Sea and the land of Israel through which the Israelites wandered for 40 years, as recounted by Nephi^{1}.
  - Wilderness of the Nephites, into which the followers of Nephi^{1} fled, following a warning from God to separate themselves from the Lamanites.
  - Wilderness of the Lamanites, area in which the separated Lamanite people hunted for food.
  - Wilderness of Unbelievers, a metaphorical wilderness described by Isaiah, as quoted by Jacob^{2}, in which unbelievers perish.
  - Wilderness of Abraham, where during his wanderings, the Biblical patriarch obeyed God in offering up his son in similitude of the sacrifice of Christ, as explicated by Jacob^{2}.
  - Wilderness of Mosiah, region beyond the land of Nephi into which Mosiah^{1} and his followers fled until arriving at the land of Zarahemla. At a later time, groups of Nephites, including Zeniff, attempted to reverse that journey to regain the land of their inheritance. Likely same wilderness where Zeniff hid women and children before going to battle against Lamanites. The sons of Mosiah^{2} again reversed that journey to go preach to the Lamanites.
  - Wilderness of the Mulekites, area into which the followers of Mulek (the purported last son of Jewish king Zedekiah^{1}), travelled as they escaped the fall of Jerusalem.
  - Wilderness of the Jaredites, found by the explorers sent by King Limhi who lost their way and stumbled into a land covered in skeletal human remains and ruins.
  - Wilderness of Alma^{1}, into which Alma^{1} and his followers fled to escape the army of King Noah^{3}. They eventually came upon a place of clear water eight days into the wilderness (which place they called Helam), where they settled. After Helam was found and captured by the Lamanites, and the people were tormented by Amulon, Alma^{1} and his followers escaped again into this wilderness, and rested in a valley a day's travel away (which valley they called Alma). A further twelve day's distance took them to Zarahemla.
  - Wilderness of the Noahites, beyond the Land of Shemlon, into which the followers of King Noah^{3} fled to escape the Lamanite army, and from which the captive survivors, including Limhi, were returned and forbidden to reenter. The former priests of Noah^{3} captured daughters of the Lamanites and carried them captive back into this wilderness. Some time later, with the help of Ammon^{2} and Gideon, the people of Limhi were able to escape back into this wilderness to be united with the people of Mosiah^{2}.
  - Wilderness of Sidon, to the west and north of the River Sidon (where the war of the Amlicites/Lamanites and the Nephite people of Alma^{2} was fought), and into which the defeated Amlicite and Lamanite survivors fled and where many were devoured by ravenous beasts and birds of prey.

== Z ==
- City of Zarahemla, major capital of Nephites from about 200 BC to AD 200
- Land of Zarahemla, general reference to the area near the city of Zarahemla
- Land of Zebulun, Israelite territory
- City of Zeezrom, Nephite city on southwest frontier
- Mount Zerin, (/ˈziːrɪn/), mountain, presumably in Mesopotamia
- Zion, city of God

== Proposed map ==
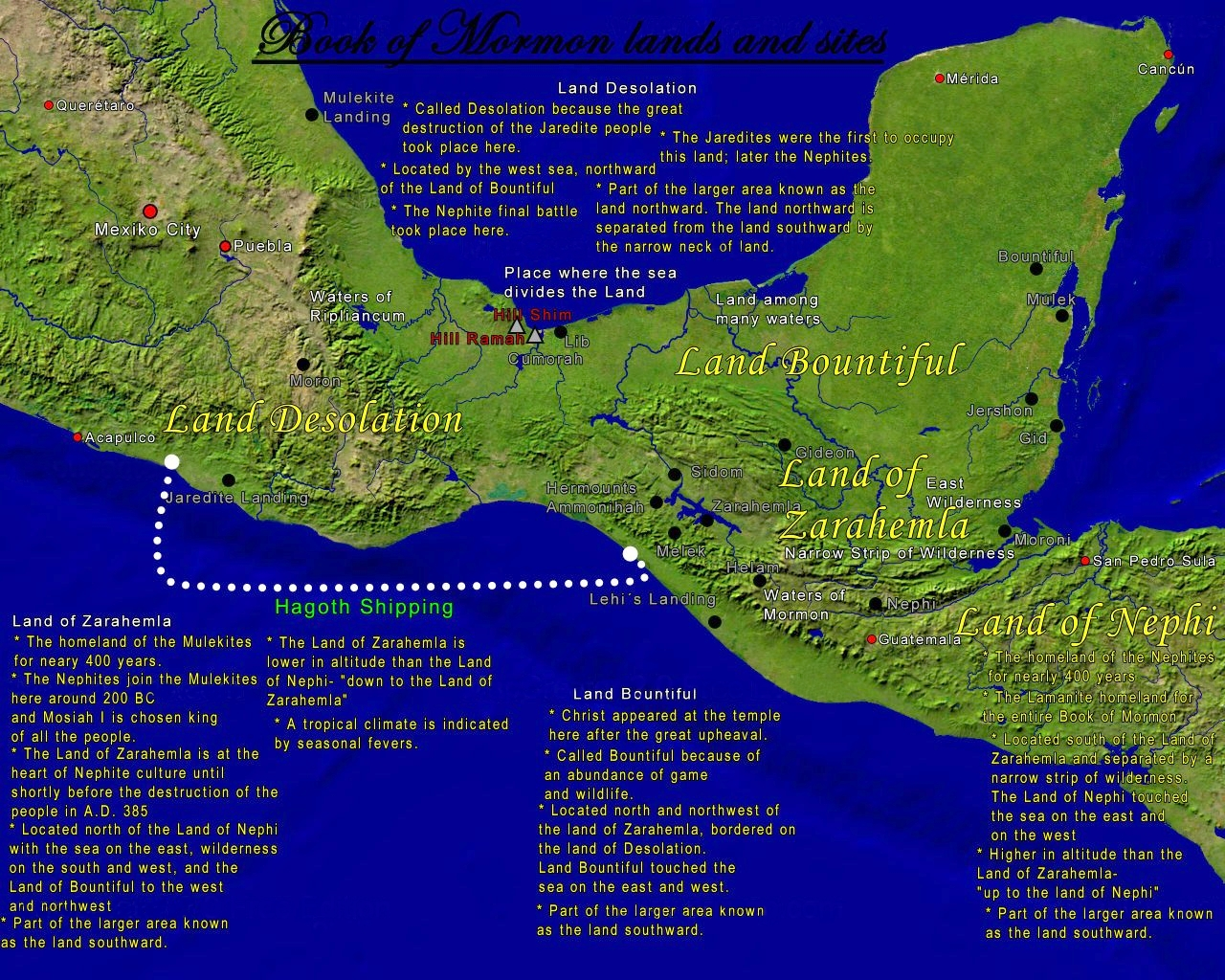
Proposed map of the lands and sites of the Book of Mormon

== See also ==
- List of Book of Mormon groups
- List of Book of Mormon people
- List of Book of Mormon prophets
- List of Mormon place names

== Bibliography ==
- The Book of Mormon: Another Testament of Jesus Christ, translated by Joseph Smith, Jr. (Salt Lake City, Utah: The Church of Jesus Christ of Latter-day Saints, 1981 [first edition, 1830]).
