= NHM =

NHM may refer to:

- National Health Mission, a healthcare initiative in India
- Natural history museum, a scientific institution with natural history collections
  - Natural History Museum, London
  - Natural History Museum of Los Angeles County
  - Natural History Museum, Vienna
- Nederlandsche Handel-Maatschappij, the Netherlands Trading Society
- NHM, a settlement thought by some to be Nahom
