= Stoneman Lake =

Waterbody in Coconino County, Arizona

- Location within Arizona Location within the United States
- Location: Coconino County, Arizona, United States
- Coordinates: 34°46′59.3″N 111°31′17.2″W
- Type: crater lake (possible)
- Basin countries: United States
- Surface area: 80 acres (32 ha)
- Max. depth: 10 ft (3.0 m)
- Surface elevation: 6,719 ft (2,048 m)

Stoneman Lake is a small lake located in northern Arizona, about 30 mi (48 km) south of the city of Flagstaff. Like the nearby Mormon Lake, it is one of the few natural lakes in Arizona.

Stoneman Lake is small and shallow, with an average surface area of less than 100 acres (40 ha) and depth of less than 10 ft (3.0 m). As such, it is subject to considerable fluctuations due to local rainfall and snowmelt conditions, and may even dry up completely. Due to the lake intermittently drying up, the availability of fish in the lake is unreliable. Nevertheless, in wet years northern pike and yellow perch are stocked here, and the lake is the location of the state record yellow perch caught in 1984. Recreational activities are generally limited to boating, wildlife viewing and camping.

Of particular interest to geologists and of some minor debate is the origin of the lake. The lake fills a nearly circular basin in a region with some historical volcanic activity, leading to the possibility that the lake is either a crater lake or a filled in sinkhole. Evidence exists to support both conclusions, as the lake lies in the middle of the Mormon volcanic field.

The lake is named after George Stoneman, who was active in the erstwhile Arizona Territory during the 1870s.
