= Western sports (North America) =

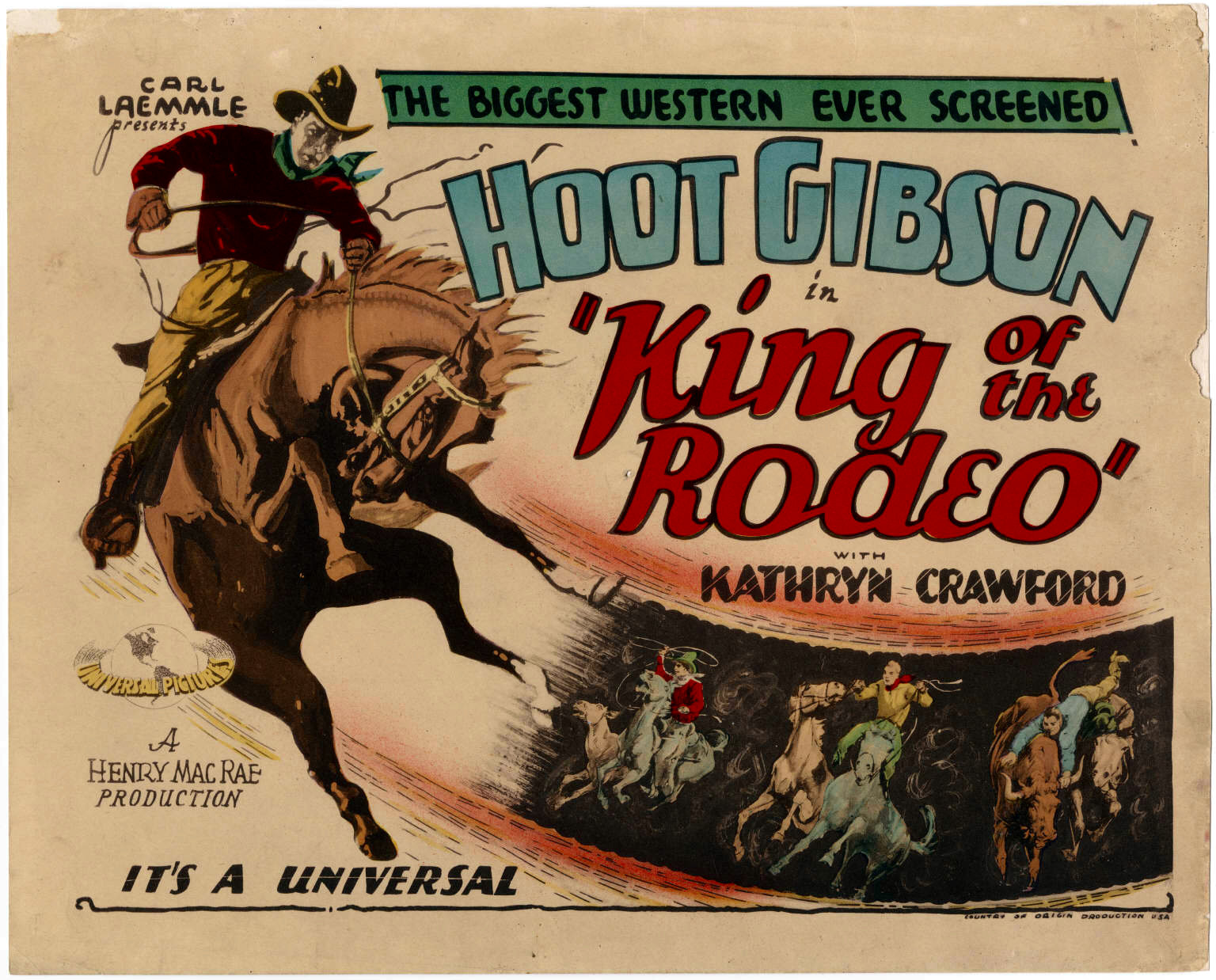
A depiction of rodeo in the 1929 film King of the Rodeo.

Western sports are sports that are associated with the western part of North America, which historically included regions such as the Wild West in the United States. They typically exemplify the stereotypical ruggedness of the region, and include some equestrian or cattle-herding activities, such as rodeo. In the second half of the 20th century, sports such as skiing and skateboarding became popular, being associated to some extent with Californian culture.

== See also ==
- Western riding
- Professional sports in the Western United States
