= Mormon Island =

Mormon Island as a place name may refer to the following places :

- Mormon Island, California, a ghost town in Sacramento County
- Mormon Island, Los Angeles, an island in San Pedro Bay
- Mormon Island State Recreation Area on the South Platte River south of Grand Island, Nebraska
