= Moroni (city in the Book of Mormon) =

One of the Nephite cities in the Book of Mormon

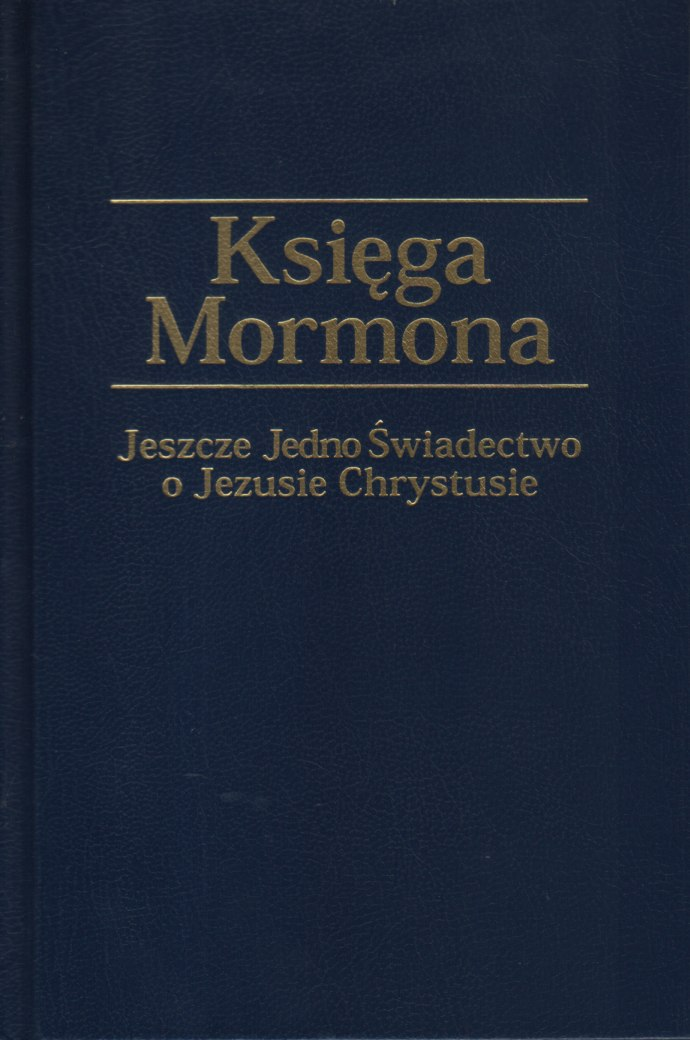
Book of Mormon, one of the Mormon sacred texts and the source of information about the city of Moroni

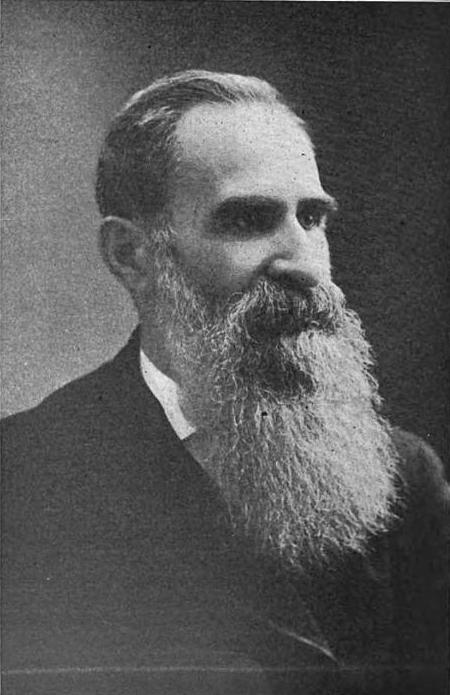
George Reynolds, one of the pioneers of Book of Mormon studies. In his works Story of the Book of Mormon and A Dictionary of the Book of Mormon, Comprising Its Biographical, Geographical and Other Proper Names, he suggested that the city of Moroni was located on the Atlantic Ocean coast

Moroni (Deseret, variously spelled, such as: 𐐣𐐄𐐡𐐄𐐤𐐌, 𐐣𐐃𐐡𐐃𐐤𐐌, 𐐣𐐄𐐡𐐃𐐤𐐌, 𐐣𐐃𐐡𐐄𐐤𐐌, or 𐐤𐐄𐐡𐐄𐐤𐐌), in the beliefs of the Latter Day Saint movement (Mormons), is one of the Nephite cities. Information about it is found in the Book of Alma and 3 Nephi, which are part of the Book of Mormon. Named after a Nephite general and prophet from the 1st century BCE, it was a significant settlement located in the southeast of Nephite lands. It held considerable strategic importance and is primarily known for the vivid description of its destruction. It appears in speeches and sermons by senior church leaders, is a subject of speculation among Mormon theologians, and is also mentioned in publications critical of this religious tradition.

== Pronunciation ==
The pronunciation of this city's name has drawn some interest from Mormon scholars. It was included in a pronunciation guide appended to every copy of the English-language Book of Mormon since 1981. Sources generally indicate a significant difference between the pronunciation preferred and commonly used today and that from the early period of Utah Territory colonization. However, no such difference exists for the city of Moroni. The original pronunciation, particularly that used by Joseph Smith, holds some importance in studies of proper names in the Book of Mormon, though it is not a decisive factor in Mormon theology. The 1869 Deseret alphabet edition of the Book of Mormon is among the sources used to determine Smith's pronunciation.

However, accounts from individuals involved in what Latter Day Saints call the translation process of the Book of Mormon shed light on how Smith initially handled unfamiliar words. Hugh Nibley, citing reports from Smith's scribes, noted that "he never pronounced such words, always limiting himself to spelling them out". Strictly within Mormon theology, there is no attempt to ascertain the original pronunciation of this word, just as there is no such inquiry into Nephite words and names in general.

Mormon theology also recognizes the inherent difficulty in pronouncing names and terms associated with this sacred text. This stems from the fact that none were orally transmitted to Joseph Smith, except perhaps the name of the angel Moroni, who introduced himself to Smith in a vision. The city of Moroni, sharing the same name, might also fall under this exception. Generally, however, from a doctrinal perspective, how the characters in the Book of Mormon pronounced these words remained unknown to the first Mormon leader.

== Placement in the Book of Mormon ==
In a strictly theological sense, the account of the city of Moroni is contained in the portion of material known as the Large Plates of Nephi. In official editions of the Book of Mormon, including the one in use since 1981, it first appears in verse 13 of chapter 50 of the Book of Alma. Additional details, including the description of its destruction, are found later in the text, specifically in chapters 8 and 9 of 3 Nephi. The current chapter-and-verse system dates back to 1879. In its first edition, published in 1830, references to Moroni were part of chapters 22, 23, and 29 of the Book of Alma and chapter 4 of 3 Nephi. It is estimated that the material about the city of Moroni was recorded on 30 April, 4 May, and 12 May 1829.

== In the Book of Mormon narrative ==
More is known about this city than about some other Nephite urban settlements, such as Angola or Moronihah. Alvin Knisley of the Reorganized Church of Jesus Christ of Latter Day Saints in his 1909 Dictionary of the Book of Mormon suggested that the city of Moroni was located on the Yucatán Peninsula.

Commentators associated with The Church of Jesus Christ of Latter Day Saints, both past and present, have also speculated about its location beyond the Mormon scriptural canon. Notable among them are Elder George Reynolds with his Story of the Book of Mormon and A Dictionary of the Book of Mormon, Comprising Its Biographical, Geographical and Other Proper Names, as well as Paul Nolan Hyde with his commentaries on the Book of Mormon. They proposed that Moroni was situated on the Atlantic Ocean coast. However, this must be contextualized within the current doctrinal stance of the church, which states only that Book of Mormon events occurred in the ancient Americas, without further specifics. It emphasizes that no additional details have been revealed on this matter. John Sorenson classified it as one of six "great cities" explicitly mentioned in the Mormon sacred text, primarily in the context of categorizing mostly Nephite urban settlements. Hugh Nibley referenced Moroni when discussing the general nature of both Jaredite and Nephite urbanization practices, noting that it was planned and built at a specific moment, much like a single structure.

According to the internal chronology of the Book of Mormon, it was founded in 72 or 71 BCE, during a period marked by widespread prosperity in Nephite society. Variations in dating arise, among other reasons, from differences between the modern calendar and that used by the Nephites. Due to its peripheral and strategic location in the southeast of Nephite lands, it was heavily fortified. Its primary purpose was to protect against Lamanite incursions. This aligned with the broader defensive strategy of Moroni, which involved stationing elite Nephite forces in heavily fortified border regions.

The source text provides some information about its location relative to other Nephite cities. To its west lay Aaron, and to its north, Nefihah. It was named after Moroni, the chief commander of the Nephite armies, a practice analyzed as part of the Nephite custom of naming cities after leaders. It was surrounded by the land of Moroni, also named after this military figure.

== Circumstances and analysis of its destruction ==
A key aspect of Moroni's presence in the Book of Mormon that garners significant attention is the circumstances of its destruction. It was reportedly swallowed by the "depths of the sea", with its inhabitants drowning. Commentators have suggested that some of the destruction may have been caused by a tsunami. They have also offered various speculations about Moroni's demise in the context of geological considerations of the regions described in the Mormon sacred text.

The spiritual reasons for Moroni's destruction appear clearer. The moral corruption and sinful lives of its residents necessitated a cleansing of the land, analogous to the corruption and destruction of the victims of the biblical Genesis Flood.

== In criticism of the Book of Mormon ==
Sandra Tanner derived the name from Moroni, the capital of the Comoros, a nation on the eastern coast of Africa. This claim is rejected by Mormon apologetics, which note that while the settlement that became the Comorian Moroni likely originated in the 10th century, it did not become a capital until 1876. They also argue that the likelihood of Joseph Smith encountering it on maps is low. The Comoros allegedly entered young Smith's awareness through his fascination with tales of Captain Kidd.

Vernal Holley, in his 1983 book Book of Mormon Authorship: A Closer Look, suggested that it might derive from Monroe, a location within the geographical context Joseph Smith, the founder of the Latter Day Saint movement, must have been familiar with. Mormon apologetics dismiss this, pointing out that although Monroe was established in 1808, it does not appear on New York maps from 1822 or 1831. The Book of Mormon, however, was first published in 1830.

== In Mormon theology and Book of Mormon studies ==
The existence of the city of Moroni has not been corroborated by external sources. Linguists affiliated with The Church of Jesus Christ of Latter Day Saints have considered the etymology of the city's name, generally pointing to its Semitic origin, with Aramaic as a less likely source language. It may also be derived from the Egyptian language. In a strictly theological context, a partial Jaredite origin for the name is noted as a possibility.

The city's name has appeared in studies of unorthodox naming practices within the Book of Mormon and has been used to argue for the authenticity of the Mormon sacred text.

Moroni has featured in Book of Mormon apologetics for decades. As early as 1909, in New Witnesses for God: Part III. The Evidences of the Truth of the Book of Mormon, Elder B. H. Roberts used the city's name to highlight differences between Jaredite and Nephite naming practices.

== In Mormon culture ==
Beyond etymological and theological speculation, Moroni has found a place in Mormon culture. It appears in church-published educational and entertainment materials, such as the October 1992 issue of the magazine Friend. Despite sharing the same name, the town of Moroni in Sanpete County, Utah, is not connected to the city described in the Book of Mormon. It was named in modern times after the Nephite prophet and military leader.

The city of Moroni is frequently referenced by various church leaders and has appeared in their sermons for over 130 years. Elder Orson Pratt, a member of the Quorum of the Twelve, mentioned it in a December 1872 address. Elder Howard W. Hunter, then serving in the Quorum of the Twelve, referenced its destruction in a speech on 1 July 1973. Elder LeGrand Richards, also a member of the Quorum of the Twelve, spoke of it in an address on 6 April 1976, dedicated to the value of holy scriptures. President Gordon B. Hinckley mentioned it in his address during the October General Conference on 2 October 2005, teaching about responding to natural disasters.

== Bibliography ==
- Hyde, Paul Nolan (2015). A Comprehensive Commentary of the Book of Alma. Orem: Parrish Press.
- Grover, Jr., Jerry D. (2014). Geology of the Book of Mormon. Utah: Vineyard. ISBN 978-0-9863189-0-0.
