= Professional sports in the Western United States =

Professional sports have existed in the United States since the late 19th century. Professional sports did not enter into the American West until the mid-twentieth century. However, the expansion of professional sports into the West has helped to increase the popularity of each of the professional leagues and has changed the landscape of professional sports in America. Based on revenue, Major League Baseball (MLB), the National Basketball Association (NBA), the National Football League (NFL), the National Hockey League (NHL), and Major League Soccer (MLS) are the major professional sports leagues in the United States.

== History ==
Prior to World War II, top-level professional sports in the United States did not exist in the American West. Most teams were located in the Northeast and Midwest, and no top-level professional teams existed west of Kansas City.

The Pacific Coast League, a baseball league founded in 1903, was never recognized as a true major league, but its quality of play was considered very high. While many PCL players went on to play in the major leagues, teams often could offer competitive salaries to avoid being outbid for their players' services. After World War II, the PCL suffered a sharp drop in attendance, primarily due to the availability of major league games on television. The hammer blow to the PCL's major league dreams came in 1958, when the Brooklyn Dodgers moved to Los Angeles and the New York Giants moved to San Francisco. As a result, three of the PCL's flagship teams (the Los Angeles Angels, the Hollywood Stars and the San Francisco Seals) were immediately forced to relocate to smaller markets. Additionally, the PCL lost customers to the major league teams which now occupied the same territory. The league never recovered from these blows and reverted to Triple-A classification in 1958.

The Western Hockey League (WHL; not to be confused with the modern junior hockey league of the same name) operated from 1952 to 1974. There was speculation that the WHL could grow into a major league capable of rivaling even the long-entrenched National Hockey League.

Professional football had a limited presence on the West Coast. There were two barnstorming teams that used West Coast names and players in 1926 (the Los Angeles Buccaneers and Los Angeles Wildcats), but both teams were based in Illinois. West Coast football received a major boost in 1933, when the National Football League, after six years of hiring very few black players, imposed a formal color barrier, locking the best black football players out of the NFL and forcing them to find work elsewhere. For many, "elsewhere" turned out to be the West Coast: by the late 1930s, the integrated Los Angeles Bulldogs had risen to parity with the NFL, and by 1940, enough talent was there to launch the Pacific Coast Professional Football League. The PCPFL thrived through World War II until a sequence of events, triggered by the launch of the All-America Football Conference, led the NFL to establish a team in Los Angeles and lift its color barrier. The PCPFL spent its last years as a minor league, eventually folding in 1948.

== Expansion to the West ==
After World War II, there were a number of factors leading to the expansion of professional sports in the West. The primary reason for the expansion was the population boom of metropolitan areas in the West. Population centers grew at a much faster rate in the West than in other parts of the country.

Leaders of growing metropolitan areas also felt that attracting professional sports teams was an important way to legitimize their communities as modern cities. In order to attract teams, cities used public funding to build new stadiums. Sports boosters argued that new stadiums not only provided cultural centers for the community but helped to attract tourists and bring in new investment dollars to the city. Cities also offered teams favorable subsidies that provided further incentives for leagues to expand West.

Team owners jumped at the chance to relocate their teams to the West. Owners who had sustained financial losses over the years saw relocation as a viable option to increase short-term profits. Western cities offered new stadiums, access to new markets, and subsidies that many cities in the East could not offer. Western cities also often offered broadcasting agreements and assumptions of past debts. Team owners used the desire of Western cities to host professional teams to their advantage. Owners were able to use the terms offered by Western cities to leverage negotiations with the cities in which they were originally located. Owners threatened relocation if cities did not build them new stadiums or offer increased subsidies.

Expansion into the West was not possible without advances in transportation technology. Train travel was the primary means of transporting teams from city to city prior to World War II. Teams played multiple games during the course of the week, and it was not practical for teams to be located in the West due to the slow nature of train travel. In the decades following the War, air travel gained more widespread use. The advancement of air travel allowed teams to travel great distances in a much shorter time than by train. By reducing the time needed for cross-country trips, airplanes made it possible for teams in the West to compete with teams located in the Eastern half of the country.

== Early teams ==
=== Los Angeles Rams ===
The Los Angeles Rams of the National Football League were the first professional sports team to be located west of Kansas City. In 1946, Cleveland Rams owner Dan Reeves relocated the team from Cleveland to Los Angeles, following the team's victory in the 1945 NFL Championship Game. The Rams played their games in Los Angeles Memorial Coliseum. Not only were the Rams the first NFL team in the West, but they were also the first NFL team to have African-American players on their squad since 1932 by signing Kenny Washington and Woody Strode in 1946. The Rams have been in the Los Angeles metropolitan area for most of the time since then, with the exception of a 21-season stretch (1995–2015) in which the team played in St. Louis, Missouri.

=== San Francisco 49ers ===
The San Francisco 49ers, currently in the NFL, began their life in the same season as the Rams arrived in Los Angeles, but in a different league—they were one of the eight charter teams of the rival All-America Football Conference (AAFC). In the four seasons of the AAFC's existence, the Niners had the second-best cumulative record, behind the winner of all of the league's championships, the Cleveland Browns. When the AAFC folded after the 1949 season, the Niners were one of three AAFC teams accepted into the NFL. Of these three teams, the Niners and Browns still play in the league.

The AAFC had a second team on the West Coast, the Los Angeles Dons, but that team was less successful and was not accepted into the NFL.

=== Los Angeles Dodgers and San Francisco Giants ===
The Los Angeles Dodgers and San Francisco Giants were the first MLB teams to play in the West, when they were relocated in 1958 from Brooklyn and New York, respectively. Both teams were motivated to move because of new stadiums being offered in California.

The New York Giants played at the Polo Grounds since the team's inception, and owner Horace Stoneham longed for a new stadium due to the lack of attendance at home games in the seasons leading up to the move. Stoneham was not pleased with the way talks with New York City officials were going, so he began to look elsewhere. On August 19, 1957, Stoneham announced the Giants' relocation to San Francisco. The Giants played their first two seasons at Seals Stadium before moving to Candlestick Park in 1960.

Brooklyn Dodgers owner Walter O'Malley had a similar situation to that of Stoneham. O'Malley's team played in Ebbets Field, which seated only 35,000 fans, had parking spots for only 700 cars, and was located in a decaying neighborhood. New York officials once again failed to meet O'Malley's demands for a new stadium with more parking and that could be more easily reached. The city of Los Angeles offered O'Malley a new stadium in Chavez Ravine. The area provided easy access to multiple freeways as well as an uncontested media market in one of the nation's largest metropolitan areas. O'Malley talked with Stoneham about the move, and both agreed that the rivalry between the two clubs should remain intact. On October 8, 1957, O'Malley announced the Dodgers move to Los Angeles. On April 15, 1958 the two teams faced in the first regular-season game since their relocation. The Giants won the game 8-0.

=== Los Angeles Lakers ===
The Los Angeles Lakers became the first NBA franchise to play in the West after they relocated from Minneapolis in 1960. The Lakers had some success on the court in Minneapolis, but attendance at home games had decreased significantly in the mid-to-late 1950s. Encouraged by the financial success of the Los Angeles Dodgers since their move from Brooklyn in 1958, Lakers owner Bob Short decided to relocate the team before the 1960–1961 season. The Lakers have gone on to be one of the most successful franchises in the NBA history by winning 16 NBA Championships.

=== Los Angeles Kings and Oakland Seals ===
Prior to the 1967–1968 season, the NHL expanded from its "original six" teams (Note: The term "Original Six" is not entirely accurate. Only two of these teams, the Montreal Canadiens and Toronto Maple Leafs, were among the original NHL teams from 1917. However, the remaining four all joined the NHL in its first 10 years of operation, and after the 1941–42 season, the league consisted of only these six teams until its 1967 expansion.) to twelve. Among the six new franchises were the Los Angeles Kings and Oakland Seals. The expansion into California was aided by entrepreneur and Los Angeles Lakers owner Jack Kent Cooke. Cooke, originally from Canada, wanted to bring his favorite sport to Los Angeles and was awarded a new franchise on February 9, 1966. As part of his plan to bring hockey to the West Coast, Cooke built The Great Western Forum, a new stadium which became home to both the Kings and Lakers. The Oakland Seals' time in California was short-lived. After entering the league in 1967, the team consistently had one of the worst records in the league. In 1976, the Seals relocated and became the Cleveland Barons.

== List of professional sports teams in the West ==
NFL

- Los Angeles Rams: 1946–1994, 2016–present
- San Francisco 49ers: AAFC, 1946–1949; NFL, 1950–present
- Los Angeles Chargers: AFL, 1960–1969; NFL, 1970–present (as San Diego Chargers, 1961–2016)
- Las Vegas Raiders: NFL, 2020–present (as Oakland Raiders: AFL, 1960–1969; NFL, 1970–1981, 1995–2019) (as Los Angeles Raiders, 1982–1994)
- Denver Broncos: AFL, 1960–1969; NFL, 1970–present
- Seattle Seahawks: (1976–present)
- Phoenix/Arizona Cardinals: 1988–1993 as Phoenix Cardinals, 1994–present as Arizona Cardinals

MLB

- Los Angeles Dodgers: (1958–present)
- San Francisco Giants: (1958–present)
- Los Angeles Angels (1961–present): 1961–1965, 2016–present as Los Angeles Angels; 1965–1996 as California Angels; 1997–2004 as Anaheim Angels; 2005–2015 as Los Angeles Angels of Anaheim
- Athletics (1968–present)
- San Diego Padres (1969–present)
- Seattle Mariners (1977–present)
- Colorado Rockies (1993–present)
- Arizona Diamondbacks (1998–present)

NBA

- Los Angeles Lakers (1960–present)
- San Francisco/Golden State Warriors (1962–present): 1962–1971 as San Francisco Warriors; 1971–present as Golden State Warriors
- Seattle SuperSonics (1967–2008): moved to Oklahoma City in 2008, where the team is now known as the Oklahoma City Thunder
- San Diego Rockets (1967–1971): moved to Houston in 1971, now known as the Houston Rockets
- Phoenix Suns (1968–present)
- Portland Trail Blazers (1970–present)
- Denver Nuggets (1967–present): Founded as Denver Larks in the ABA in 1967, but changed name to Rockets before playing a game. 1967–1974 as Denver Rockets; 1974–1976 in ABA as Denver Nuggets; 1976–present in NBA
- San Diego/Los Angeles Clippers: San Diego Clippers from 1978–1984; 1984–present as Los Angeles Clippers
- Utah Jazz (1979–present)
- Sacramento Kings (1985–present)

NHL

- Los Angeles Kings (1967–present)
- California Golden Seals (1967–1976): 1967 as California Seals; 1967–1970 as Oakland Seals; 1970–1976 as California Golden Seals
- Colorado Rockies: (1976–1982)
- San Jose Sharks (1991–present)
- Anaheim Ducks: 1993–2006 as Mighty Ducks of Anaheim, 2006–present as Anaheim Ducks
- Colorado Avalanche (1995–present)
- Phoenix/Arizona Coyotes: 1996–2014 as Phoenix Coyotes, 2014–2024 as Arizona Coyotes
- Vegas Golden Knights: 2017–present
- Seattle Kraken (2021–present)

MLS

- Colorado Rapids (1996–present)
- LA Galaxy (1996–present)
- Los Angeles FC (2018–present)
- San Jose Earthquakes (1996–2005, 2008–present): 1996–1999 as San Jose Clash; 2000–2005 and 2008–present as San Jose Earthquakes.
- Chivas USA (2005–2014; based in Los Angeles)
- Real Salt Lake (2005–present)
- Seattle Sounders FC (2009–present)
- Portland Timbers (2011–present)

NASL (1968–1984)

- California Surf (1978–1981)
- Colorado Caribous (1978)
- Denver Dynamos (1974–1975)
- Oakland Clippers (1968)
- Oakland Stompers (1978)
- Portland Timbers (1975–1982)
- San Diego Toros (1968)
- San Diego Jaws (1976)
- San Diego Sockers (1978–1984)
- San Jose Earthquakes (1974–1984)
- Seattle Sounders (1974–1983)
- Team Hawaii (1977)

WNBA

- Los Angeles Sparks (1997–present)
- Phoenix Mercury (1997–present)
- Sacramento Monarchs (1997–2009)
- Seattle Storm (2000–present)
- Las Vegas Aces (2017–present): 1997–2002 as Utah Starzz
- Golden State Valkyries (2025–present)
- Portland Fire (2026–present)

NWSL

- Angel City FC (2022–present)
- Portland Thorns FC (2013–present)
- Utah Royals FC (2018–2020)
- San Diego Wave FC (2022–present)
- Seattle Reign FC (2013–present): 2013–2018 as Seattle Reign FC, 2019 as Reign FC, 2020–2023 as OL Reign

WPS (2009–2011)

- FC Gold Pride (2009–2011)
- Los Angeles Sol (2009–2010)

WUSA (2001–2003)

- San Diego Spirit (2001–2003)
- San Jose CyberRays (2001–2003): 2001 as Bay Area CyberRays

== Motorsports ==
California has long been a hub for motorsports. The Grand Prix of Long Beach is a street race held since 1975, whereas the Caesars Palace Grand Prix was held in the early 1980s and the Grand Prix of Las Vegas in the late 1990s. Sonoma Raceway, Laguna Seca Raceway and the former Riverside International Speedway are notable road courses in California, whereas ovals include Auto Club Speedway, California State Fairgrounds Race Track, Ontario Motor Speedway and Irwindale Speedway.

Other racetracks in Western United States include Phoenix International Raceway, Las Vegas Motor Speedway and Miller Motorsports Park.

Auto Club Raceway at Pomona has hosted NHRA drag racing for over 50 years. Other NHRA venues in the West are Bandimere Speedway, Pacific Raceways, Wild Horse Motorsports Park, Las Vegas and Sonoma.

The Lucas Oil Off Road Racing Series is based in Western United States. Notable off-road courses include Lake Elsinore Motorsports Park, Glen Helen Raceway and Prairie City State Park in California, Las Vegas in Nevada and Wild Horse Pass in Arizona. Notable desert races include the Mint 400 and Primm 300.

The Pikes Peak International Hill Climb is the most famous hillclimbing race in the world.

The AMA Supercross Championship has hosted events in several Western cities, such as Anaheim, Denver, Las Vegas, Los Angeles, Oakland, Phoenix, San Diego, Salt Lake City, San Francisco and Seattle.

== See also ==
- Western Soccer Alliance
- Western Hockey League
- Pacific Southwest Hockey League
- West Coast Hockey League
- AFC West (NFL)
- NFC West (NFL)
- History of the National Football League in Los Angeles
- American League West (MLB)
- National League West (MLB)
- Northwest Division (NBA)
- Pacific Division (NBA)
- Pacific Division (NHL)
- Western Conference (MLS)
- Western Conference (WNBA)
