= Lakeview, Arizona =

Populated place in Coconino County, Arizona, US

- Populated place
- Location within the state of Arizona Lakeview (the United States)
- Coordinates: 34°54′33″N 111°26′50″W
- Country: United States
- State: Arizona
- County: Coconino
- Elevation: 7,169 ft (2,185 m)
- Time zone: UTC-7 (Mountain (MST))
  - Summer (DST): UTC-7 (MST)
- Area code: 928
- FIPS code: 04-40000
- GNIS feature ID: 30857

Lakeview is a populated place situated in Coconino County, Arizona, United States, south of Mormon Lake. It has an estimated elevation of 7,169 feet (2,185 m) above sea level.

Although at times confused with the neighboring community of Mormon Lake, a 1966 Board on Geographic Names decision clarified that they are distinct communities. However, as Mormon Lake has a post office, while Lakeview does not, Lakeview residents have a Mormon Lake address.
