= Mormon Lake, Arizona =

Populated place in Coconino County, Arizona

- Populated place
- Location within the state of Arizona Mormon Lake (the United States)
- Coordinates: 34°54′41″N 111°27′10″W
- Country: United States
- State: Arizona
- County: Coconino

Area
  - Total: 1.40 sq mi (3.62 km^{2})
  - Land: 1.39 sq mi (3.61 km^{2})
  - Water: 0.0039 sq mi (0.01 km^{2})
- Elevation: 7,136 ft (2,175 m)

Population (2020)
  - Total: 90
  - Density: 64.6/sq mi (24.93/km^{2})
- Time zone: UTC-7 (Mountain (MST))
  - Summer (DST): UTC-7 (MST)
- ZIP code: 86038
- Area code: 928
- FIPS code: 04-47680
- GNIS feature ID: 2805220

Mormon Lake is a populated place situated in Coconino County, Arizona, south of the eponymous lake. It has an estimated elevation of 7,146 feet (2,178 m) above sea level.

Mormon Lake, and nearby Lakeview, were developed along Mormon Lake during wetter years when the lake was higher. Various homes have docks far from the current shoreline. This community is built around Mormon Lake Lodge, which originally was on the lake, but now relies on a fishing pond located adjacent to the Lodge.

Although at times confused with the neighboring community of Lakeview, a 1966 GNIS Board Decision clarified that they are separate, distinct communities, located one mile apart. The question has recently become more difficult as Mormon Lake has a post office, while Lakeview does not, thus Lakeview residents have a Mormon Lake address.

== Demographics ==
Historical population
| Census | Pop. | Note | %± |
|---|---|---|---|
| 2020 | 90 | | — |
U.S. Decennial Census

== Education ==
It is in the Flagstaff Unified School District.

The zoned secondary schools are Mount Elden Middle School and Flagstaff High School.
