= Prairie City, California =

Prairie City
- Former settlement

- Location within California Location within the United States
- Coordinates: 38.58257°N 121.5040°W
- Country: United States
- State: California
- County: Sacramento
- Established: 1852

California Historical Landmark
- Reference no.: 464

Prairie City was a gold-mining community that once sat on the American River in the Sierra Nevada foothills, near present-day Folsom in Sacramento County, California, United States, near Prairie City Road, Sacramento.

The mining village was first announced in June 1853 in the Sacramento Daily Union. A July article mentions that the city had approximately 1500 inhabitants. What was left of the town is believed to be covered in river rocks, from gold dredging of the American River in the early 1900s.

When construction was being performed for the freeway on-ramp near an Intel building, a few bodies were unearthed during construction. Though the names of these people are unknown, it is assumed they were Prairie City residents. Their skeletal remains were re-buried in the Mormon Island relocation cemetery, south of Folsom Lake.

== Present day ==
The general site of Prairie City is a California Historical Landmark (#464).

The Folsom subdivision Prairie Oaks was named for it, because it is believed that the city once stood in this general area.

== See also ==
- California Historical Landmarks in Sacramento County, California
- Mining communities of the California Gold Rush
