= Lehi (Bible) =

Biblical location

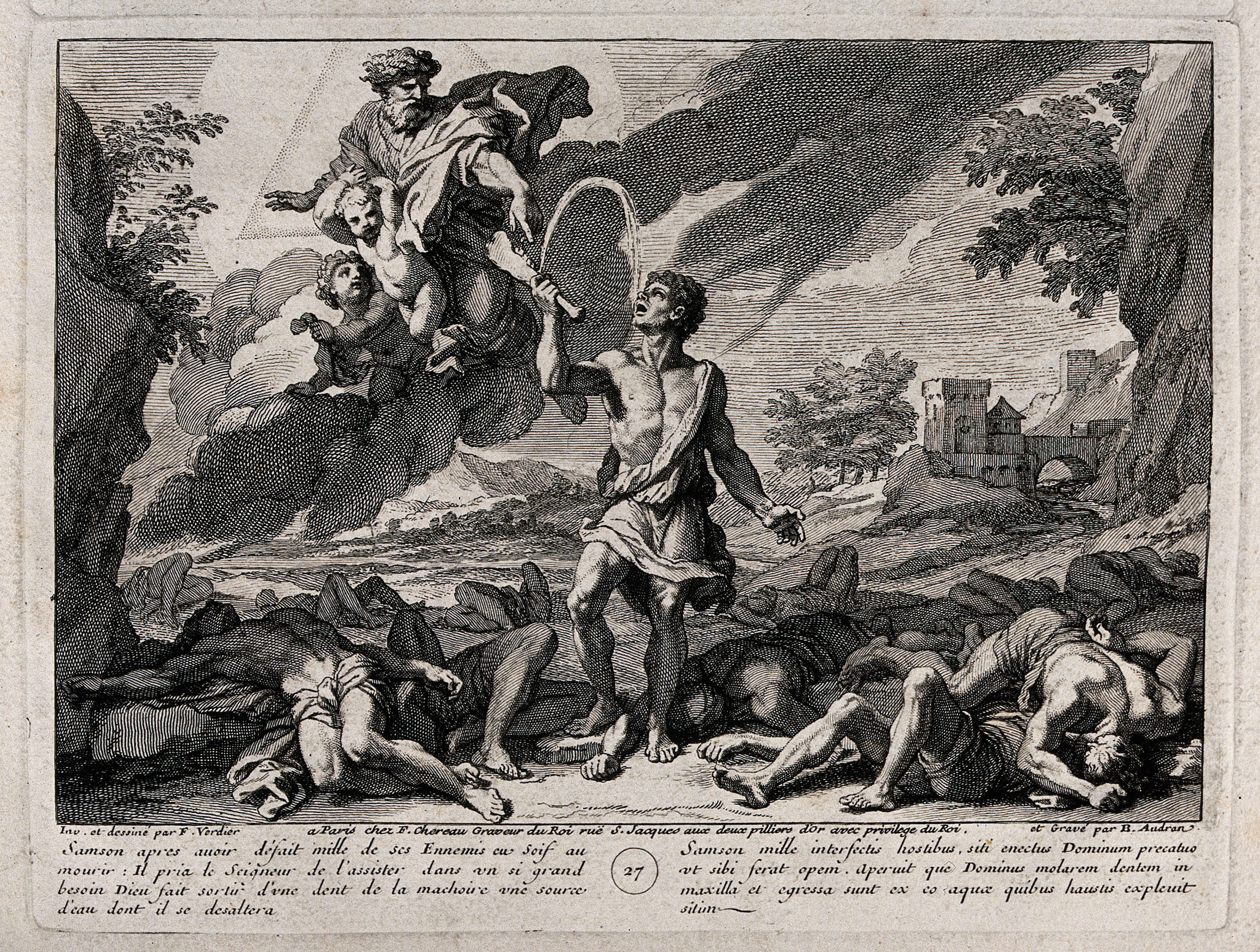
Sammson at Lehi(Engraving by B. Audran after F. Verdier, 1698.)

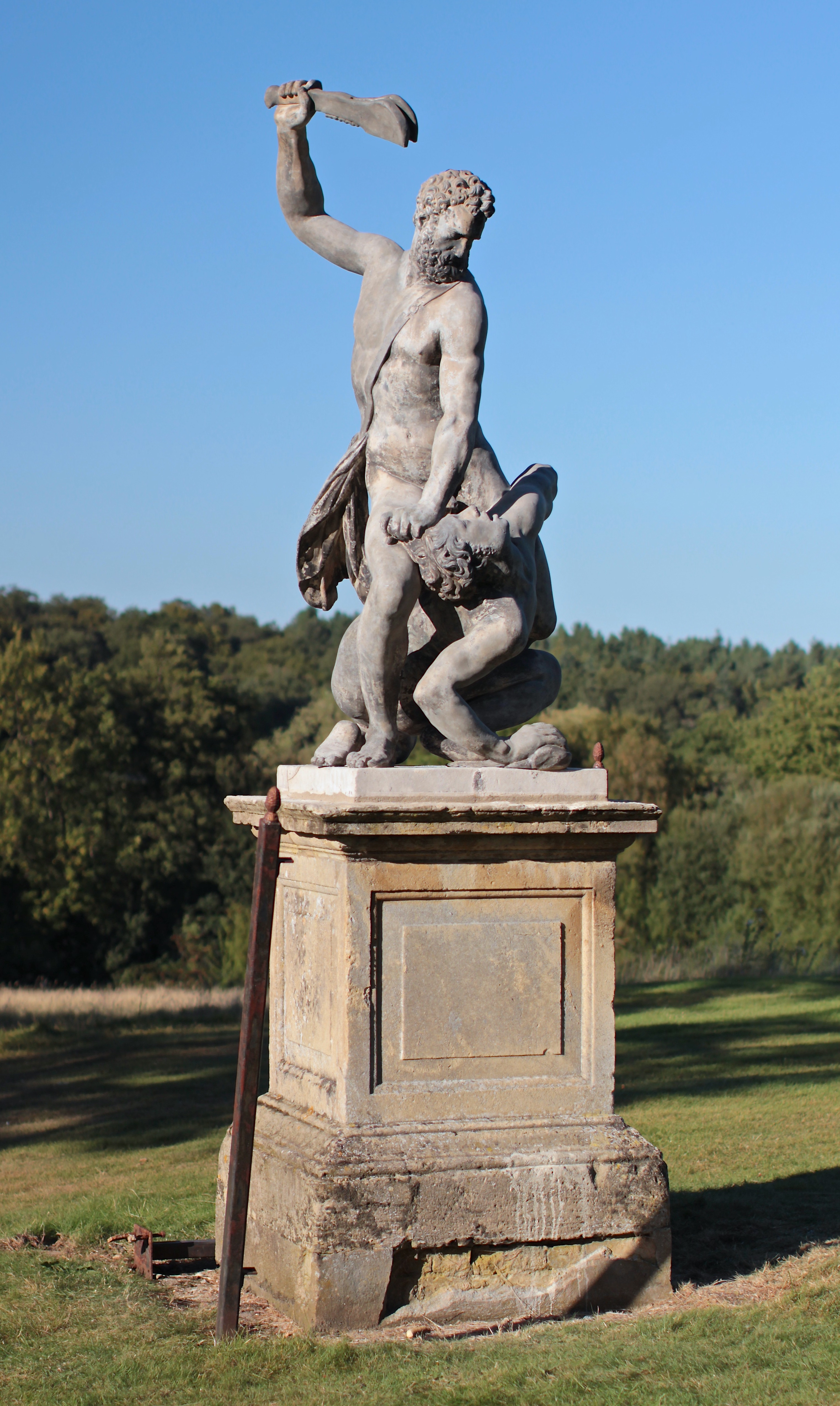
Samson defeating a Philistine, Trent Park, Enfield

Lehi (Hebrew: לֶחִי), also known as Ramath Lehi (רָמַת לֶחִי), is a place mentioned in the Bible.

== History ==
The Book of Judges relates that Lehi was the site of an encampment by a Philistine army, and the subsequent engagement with the Israelite leader Samson. This encounter is famous for Samsons' use of a donkey's jawbone as a club, and the name Ramath Lehi means Jawbone Hill.

During the Israelite Monarchy, Lehi was the site of another battle between Israel and Philistine forces. Here the text relates that Shammah the Hararite (one of David's Mighty Warriors) held his ground in a field of lentils, when the Israelites retreated.

== Location ==
The exact site of Lehi is unknown, but one suggested location is ʿAin Hanniyeh.
