= Nauvoo, York County, Pennsylvania =

Unincorporated area in Pennsylvania, US

Nauvoo, Pennsylvania
- Unincorporated community
- Location within Pennsylvania
- Coordinates: 40°09′26″N 76°53′05″W
- Country: United States
- State: Pennsylvania
- County: York
- Elevation: 512 ft (156 m)
- Time zone: UTC-5 (Eastern (EST))
  - Summer (DST): UTC-4 (EDT)
- Area code: 717
- GNIS feature ID: 1204260

Nauvoo (also Navoo) is an unincorporated community in York County, Pennsylvania, United States.
