= Mormon Island, California =

Historic site under Folsom Lake in California

Mormon Island
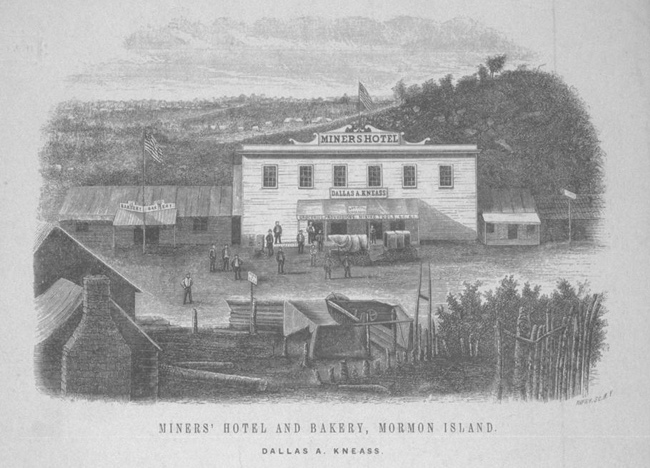
- View of Miners Hotel, Mormon Island, California, (1850s lithograph)
- Interactive map of Mormon Island
- 38.7035°N 121.1174°W
- Location: Actual site: Under Folsom Lake; Historic marker: Folsom Lake State Recreation Area

California Historical Landmark
- Reference no.: 569

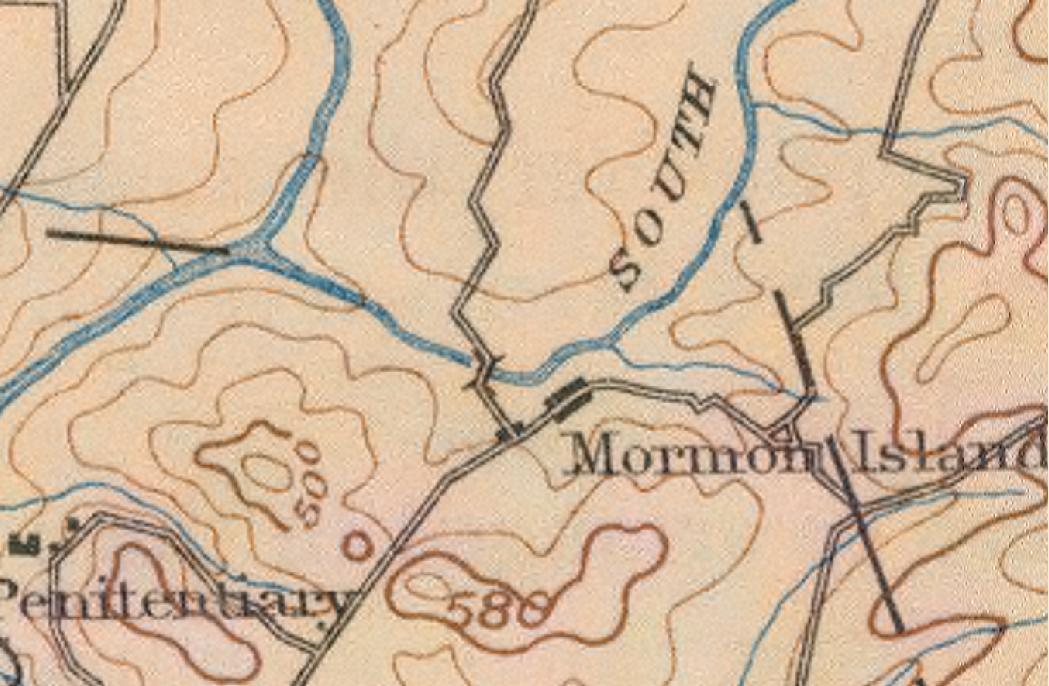
Topographical map of Mormon Island in 1892

Mormon Island was a mining town mainly populated by Mormon immigrants seeking gold in the American River during the California Gold Rush. Its site is now submerged under Folsom Lake in present-day Sacramento County, California, United States.

== History ==
Early in March 1848, W. Sidney, S. Willis, and Wilford Hudson, members of the Mormon Battalion, set out from Sutter's Fort to hunt deer. Stopping on the south fork of the American River, they found gold. They told their story on returning to the fort, and soon about 150 Mormons and other miners flocked to the site, which was named Mormon Island. This was the first major gold strike in California after James W. Marshall's discovery at Coloma. The first ball in Sacramento County was held there on December 25, 1849.

The population of the town in 1853 was more than 2,500. It had four hotels, three dry-goods stores, five general merchandise stores, an express office, and many small shops. R. C. Chambers had moved to Mormon Island in July 1850, prior to his mining successes in Montana and Utah.

A fire destroyed the town in 1856, and it was never rebuilt. The community dwindled after the California gold rush and only a scattered few families were left in the 1940s.

What was left of Mormon Island was eventually razed, as the Folsom Dam project was set to flood the town. The only visible remnant of this community is Mormon Island Cemetery, a relocation cemetery located south of the lake on the dry side of Mormon Island Dam (off of Green Valley Road in Folsom, California). The cemetery also contains remains exhumed from other cemeteries that were inundated by the creation of Folsom Lake as well as relocated graves from Prairie City which were unearthed during construction of an on-ramp to U.S. Route 50 from Prairie City Road.

Mormon Island is registered as California Historical Landmark #569. Because its former site is under Folsom Lake, the historic marker is placed at the Folsom Point picnic area of Folsom Lake State Recreation Area.

== Geographical information ==
The "island" was formed by the American River to the western, northern, and eastern sides and a man-made canal formed the southern side. The canal was used to divert water in an effort to find gold deeper within the river bed. Over time, the bulk of the town formed south of this site.

When the lake is at very low levels, some foundations of buildings and an arched bridge can be seen. Some outskirts of the town were exposed in late 2013 and early 2014 when Folsom Lake was at a record low due to the 2012–14 North American drought, but most of the town remains underwater.

== See also ==
- Mining communities of the California Gold Rush
- St. Thomas, Nevada, another former Mormon community submerged by a man-made lake
- Mormon Island (Colorado River), an island in the Colorado River below the mouth of the Virgin River.
- Mormon Island in San Pedro Bay
