= Mormon volcanic field =

Monogenetic and polygenetic volcanic field in Coconino County, Arizona

Mormon Mountain Volcanic Field

Highest point
- Elevation: 1,500 to 2,530 m (4,920 to 8,300 ft)
- Coordinates: 35°00′N 111°30′W

Geography
- Location: Coconino County, Arizona, United States

Geology
- Rock age: 13.6 million years ago
- Mountain type: Volcanic field
- Last eruption: 3.1 million years ago

Mormon volcanic field, also known as Mormon Mountain volcanic field, is a monogenetic and polygenetic volcanic field south of Flagstaff, Arizona.

The volcanic field contains over 250 vents and covers over 2,500 square kilometres (970 sq mi).

== Notable Vents ==
Name	Elevation		Location	Last eruption
Name	meters	feet	Coordinates	Last eruption
Apache Maid	-	-	-	-
Hackberry Mountain	-	-	-	-
Round Mountain	-	-	-	-
Stoneman Lake	-	-	34°46′59.3″N 111°31′17.2″W	-
Table Mountain	-	-	-	-

== See also ==
- List of volcanoes in the United States
- List of volcanic fields
