= Bountiful (Book of Mormon) =

Name of two places described in the Book of Mormon

Bountiful is the name of two places described in the Book of Mormon, a religious text dictated in 1829 by Joseph Smith. The first location is set in the Old World near Jerusalem, and the second location is set somewhere in the Americas. While secular and non-LDS scholars consider the Book of Mormon to be a work of fiction, Latter Day Saints view the book as a chronicle of actual indigenous American people. Accordingly, several scholars in The Church of Jesus Christ of Latter Day Saints have attempted to coordinate the Book of Mormon text relating to Bountiful with actual locations in the Old World and the New World.

The Book of Mormon references have inspired Mormon settlers to give the name Bountiful to two towns: Bountiful, Utah and Bountiful, British Columbia.

== Old World ==
In the First Book of Nephi in the Book of Mormon, Bountiful is described as a lush land on the coast containing "much fruit and also wild honey" where Lehi and his party settle temporarily before building their ship. After the ship is completed, Lehi's party departs Bountiful and sails to the Americas.

=== Sea "Irreantum" ===
Upon their arrival at the coast, the Book of Mormon states that Lehi's group named the sea Irreantum, which is said to mean "many waters". The Arabian Sea was historically referred to by the Latin name Mare Erythraeum. LDS researchers Lynn and Hope Hilton point out the similarity between the words Irreantum and Erythraeum.

=== Speculative real world locations ===
Many LDS scholars and researchers believe that the location of Bountiful can be correlated with any of several locations on Oman's southern Dhofar coast on the Arabian Peninsula. Locations that have been evaluated are:

- Wadi Hajr (Yemen)
- Wadi Masilah (Yemen)
- Dhalqut (Oman)
- Rakhyut (Oman)
- Salalah (Oman)
- Khor Rori/Wadi Darbat (Oman)
- Wadi Sayq/Kohr Kharfot (Oman)

In order to match the characteristics outlined in the Book of Mormon, Aston suggests that there are 12 different requirements that a viable candidate for Bountiful must meet:

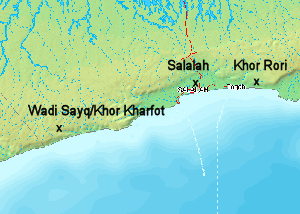
Potential Locations for Bountiful

1. The location must lie nearly eastward of Nahom (1 Nephi 17:1).
2. The coast must be accessible from the interior desert.
3. Both the general area and the location when the Lehites camped must be fertile and capable of producing crops.
4. It must be a coastal location (1 Nephi 17:5).
5. It must be very fertile, with "much fruit and also wild honey" and small game (1 Nephi 17:5-6).
6. Timber must be available with which to build a ship (1 Nephi 17:8).
7. Freshwater must be available year-round.
8. A mountain must be located nearby to account for Nephi's reference to going to a mountain to "pray oft" (1 Nephi 18:3).
9. Cliffs overlooking the ocean must be present to account for Nephi's brother's attempt to throw him "into the depths of the sea" (1 Nephi 17:48).
10. Ore and flint must be available with which to make fire and fabricate tools to build a ship" (1 Nephi 17:9)
11. No resident population at the time of the Lehite's arrival.
12. Wind and ocean currents capable of carrying a ship out into the ocean (1 Nephi 18:8)

After visiting and evaluating every site on the southern Arabian coast that might qualify as Bountiful, Aston concluded that all sites were found to be incapable of meeting every one of these requirements with the exception of Wadi Sayq/Khor Kharfot. Other researchers however disagree with this opinion and favor the location of Khor Rori 40 kilometers to the east of Salalah.

==== Wadi Sayq/Khor Kharfot ====
Aston concluded that the Wadi Sayq/Khor Kharfot site meets all of the requirements to qualify as Nephi's Bountiful. Some LDS researchers believe that the Wadi Sayq (River Valley) and Khor Kharfot (Fort Inlet or Port) site is the most viable candidate, and discount other potential sites as they lack key aspects of the "Bountiful" described by Nephi. Other LDS researchers however disagree with this opinion and discount the Wadi Sayq/Khor Kharfot site for several reasons. Reynolds, in his opinion, describes why he feels Wadi Sayq/Khor Kharfot meets the requirements described by Aston:

1. Khor Kharfot is situated less than one degree from due east of Nehem (Nahom).
2. The valley of Wadi Sayq leads to the ocean from the desert interior, and is the only wadi that flows from the high desert eastward toward the coast. The coast is accessible by traveling through the bottom of Wadi Sayq.
3. Khor Kharfot is the most fertile site on the southern Arabian coast. The region of fertility extends two miles into the Wadi Sayq.
4. There is evidence of inhabitation and use as a small seaport during the Islamic period. Water was available through freshwater springs and an ancient river.
5. A number of sizable trees exist in the area, with evidence of ancient forests. These trees could have provided sufficient lumber to build a ship.
6. Khor Kharfot has the largest permanent flow of fresh water of any site on the coast.
7. A large mountain overlooks the west end of the beach.
8. Cliffs rise above the ocean in this area.
9. Iron in the form of specular hematite is available in the Marbat plain, within a few days' hike to the east of Khor Kharfot.
10. A form of flint is available on the surface in large quantities.
11. Ancient ruins show that Khor Kharfot was occupied intermittently, although it is currently uninhabited.
12. The coast is well suited to sailing, with seasonal winds in the fall blowing east.

==== Salalah ====
In the culture of The Church of Jesus Christ of Latter-day Saints, the most popular traditional location of Bountiful is Salalah in modern Oman. LDS scholar Hugh Nibley first proposed this location as Nephi's Bountiful in an article published in the Improvement Era in 1950. Nibley's conclusion was based upon early writings describing life in Arabia, including an account describing the fertile Salalah area written by English explorer Bertram Thomas.

==== Khor Rori/Wadi Darbat ====
Khor Rori is an Iron Age ship-building and trading port about 40 kilometers east of the modern town of Salalah and in the same region as some of the other sites; Nephi's potential use of the site predates the earliest archaeological finds on this site. In contrast to inaccessible Kohr Kharfot, many LDS researchers are now of the opinion that Khor Rori better meets all of the 12 key points addressed by Aston and others, along with additional aspects that they failed to address. These additional points that Kohr Kharfot lack include:

1. Accessibility for caravan arrival.
2. A rich abundance of timber-bearing ancient and modern groves.
3. Fresh vegetation extending from Kohr Rori many miles up the Wadi Darbat.
4. Large amounts of year-round fresh water teeming with aquatic and wildlife.
5. An abundance of wild honey.
6. An inland natural port framed by twin integral seaside cliffs.
7. A readily-accessible mountain backdrop for Nephi's prayers.
8. Annual monsoon season floods that easily transport timber from Wadi Darbat directly to the seaside Kohr Rori port.
9. A protected harbor in which a ship could be rigged and seamanship could be learned.

The Old World location and scenery would have had to be impressive enough that later generations of New World Book of Mormon people would recall and honor the location by their reuse of the name "Bountiful". The competing site Kohr Kharfot remains an uninhabited and inaccessible rock canyon defile with no natural harbor, except as a temporary resting spot for passing fishermen and wandering herders due to its relatively undesirable location. The best and almost only access to this Kharfot is by sea. On the other hand, Kohr Rori has been highly desirable over time.

Today, the site supports the UNESCO archaeological site of Sumharam of Frankincense fame. Lehi's general route from Jerusalem to the Dhofar area followed many elements of the Frankincense Trail which logically places Kohr Rori as a natural terminus. Extensive archaeological research by many scholars including the 2008 work sponsored by the Omani government have found Iron tools, a temple culture with ritual cleansing and altar worship, ship building remains, and many other aspects congruent with the desirability of Kohr Rori.

Today, the larger surrounding area continues to agriculturally "blossom as the rose" in the "wilderness." (Isaiah 35:1-2) While Kohr Kharfot supports the remains of one stone goat corral and shepherd's shelter (mistakenly identified by one researcher as the remains of a Nephi-built Temple built after the pattern of Solomon's Temple), the bounty of Kohr Rofi is exemplified by hundreds of ancient and modern structures. Many LDS researchers have evolved in their thinking and now consider Kohr Rori as the most natural and logical location on the Dhofar Coast for Nephi's "Bountiful."

== New World ==
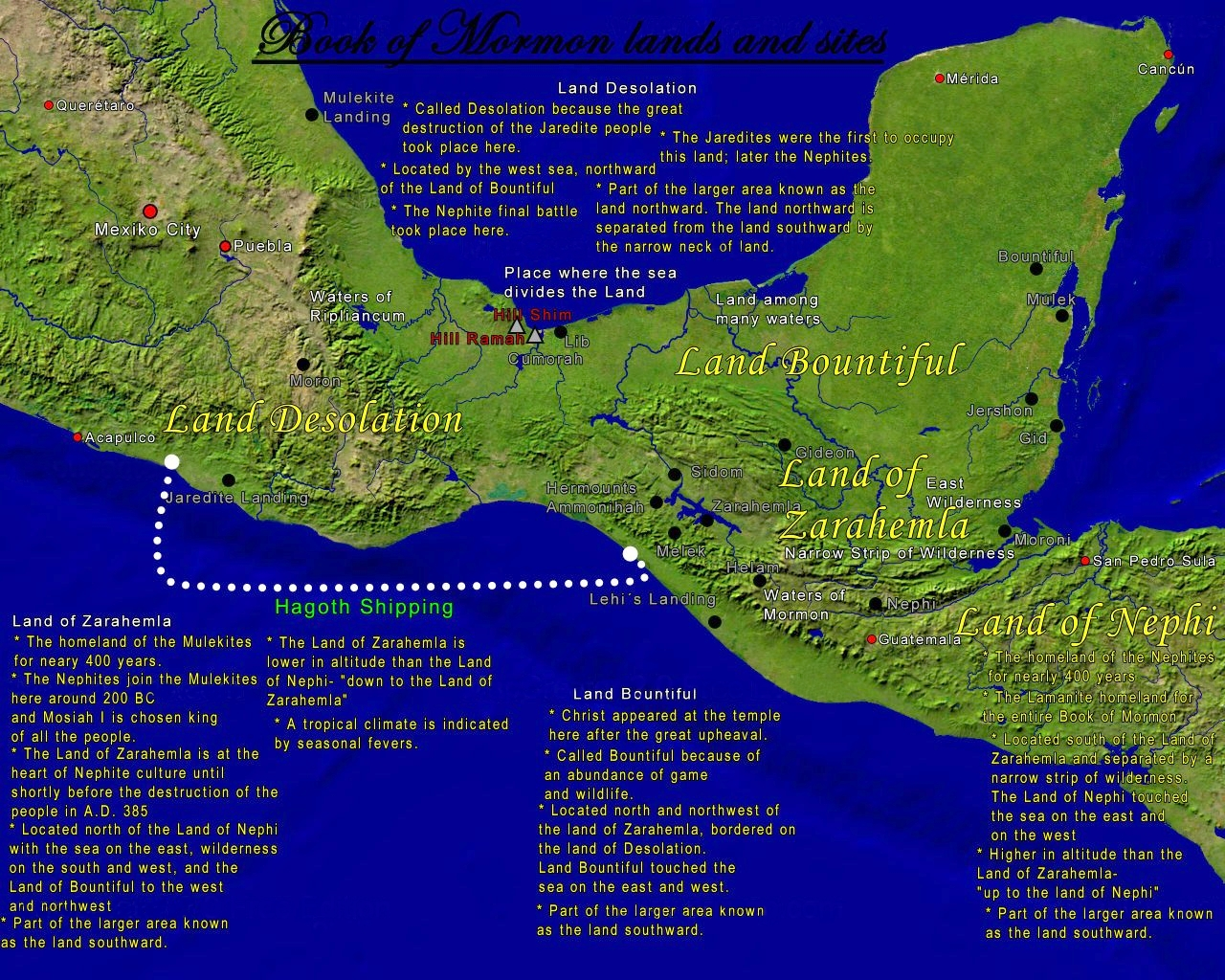
Map showing the possible lands and sites of the Book of Mormon in Mesoamerica

The Book of Mormon refers to a city on the American continent called Bountiful. It has significance in the book as the place where Jesus Christ is said to have visited people in the Book of Mormon civilization after his resurrection. As with most Book of Mormon places, secular scholars consider the New World Bountiful fictional. LDS archeologist John Sorenson believes it to have been in what today is the Mexican state of Tabasco.

An alternate view is that Bountiful was in North America. In what is known as the heartland theory, Nephi and his posterity established themselves in the Iowa area, with their primary city called Zarahemla, believed to be Montrose, Iowa, directly west across the Mississippi River from Nauvoo, Illinois.

The heartland theory has Nephi's family arriving in the Florida panhandle and gradually moving north through the Tennessee and Mississippi River valleys, eventually establishing their civilization in the Ohio area and covering an area from the Mississippi River, east to New York, and south to Florida. The idea of a central American settlement is known as the M2C theory and has begun to fall out of favor amongst Mormon scholars.

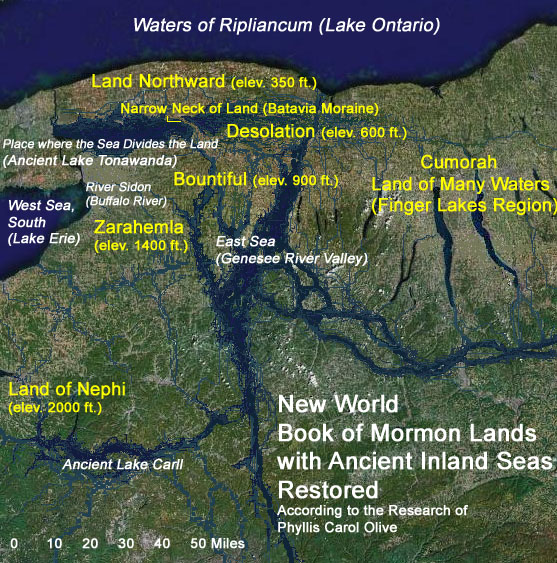
Map showing possible lands and sites of the Book of Mormon near scriptural Cumorah (Doctrine and Covenants 128:20)

Other LDS argue that the New World land and city of Bountiful cannot be very distant from the location of the land Cumorah given in LDS scripture. This interpretation understands the Cumorah in the Book of Mormon to be identical to the Cumorah mentioned in Doctrine and Covenants 128:20.
