= Mormon Reservoir (Idaho) =

Body of water in Idaho

- Location within Idaho Location within the United States
- Location: Camas County, Idaho
- Coordinates: 43°16′51″N 114°48′00″W
- Type: Reservoir
- Primary inflows: McKinney and Dairy creeks
- Primary outflows: McKinney Creek
- Basin countries: United States
- Built: 1908
- Water volume: 19,280 acre-feet (23,780,000 m^{3})
- Surface elevation: 5,050 feet (1,540 m)

Mormon Reservoir is a reservoir on McKinney Creek in Camas County, Idaho. The reservoir is surrounded by private, state, and Bureau of Land Management land, which offers opportunities for boating, fishing, camping, and hunting, among other activities. The reservoir is impounded by Mormon Dam, which was built in 1908.
