= Mormon Island (Colorado River) =

Former island near Bullhead City, Arizona

Coordinates: 35°7′N 114°35′W

Mormon Island, was an island in the Colorado River near Hardyville, in Mohave County, Arizona since removed by the action of the river.

== History ==
Mormon Island was used to assemble and launch the Southwestern Mining Company's schooner Sou'Wester, in 1879. During the low water months, steamboats could not reach the Virgin River to obtain salt from the mines in the Virgin River valley to be used in the company's silver ore reduction furnaces at Eldorado Canyon. The company bought the schooner to be able to obtain salt year-round. It was built in San Francisco, disassembled and shipped by rail to Yuma, Arizona, then shipped up river on the steamboat Gila to Hardyville where it was reassembled.
