= Mormon Lake =

Lake in Coconino County, Arizona

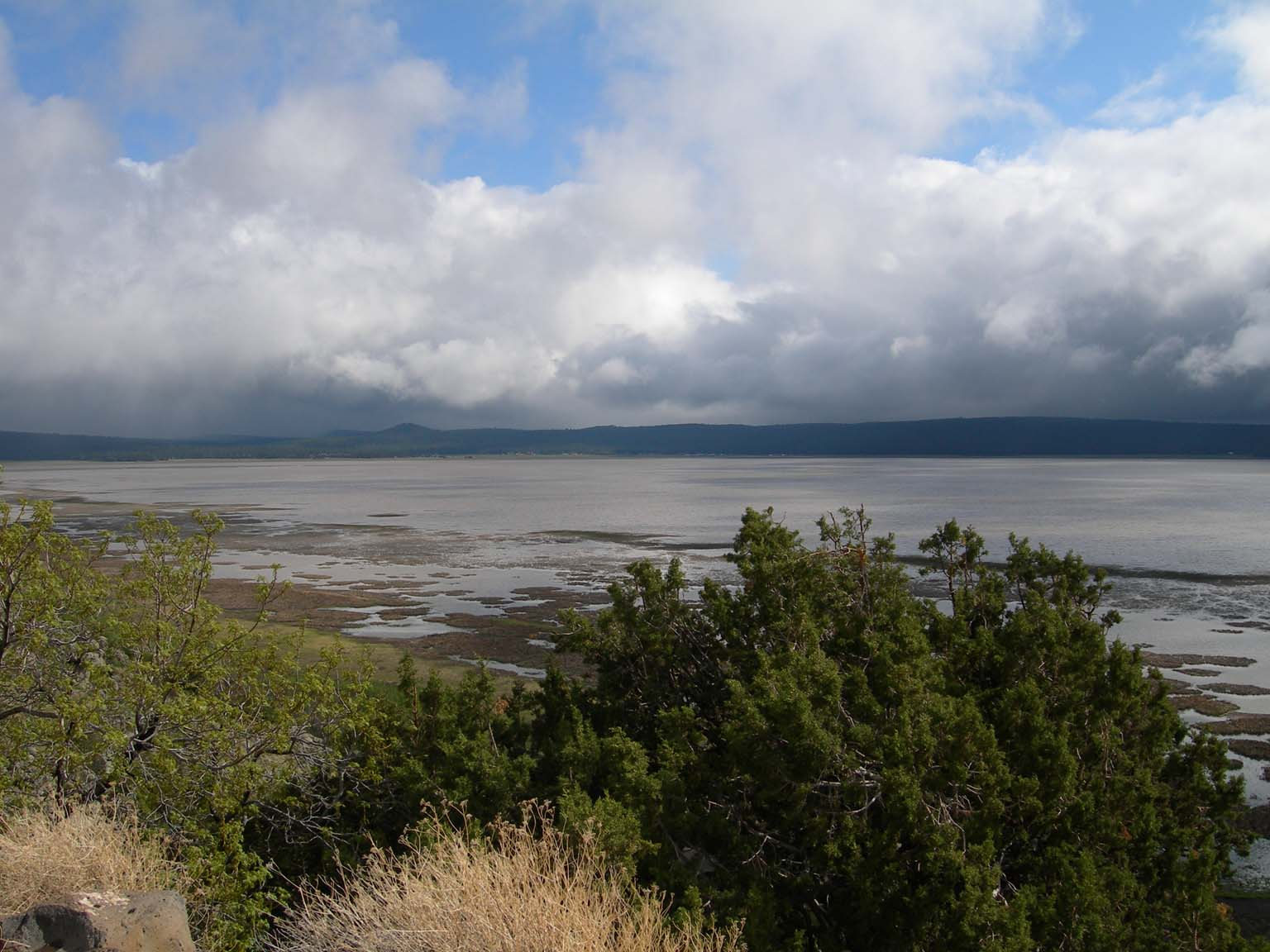

- Location within Arizona Location within the United States
- Location: Coconino County, Arizona, United States
- Coordinates: 34°56′33″N 111°27′21″W
- Basin countries: United States
- Surface area: 600 acres (240 ha)
- Average depth: 10 ft (3.0 m)
- Surface elevation: 7,100 ft (2,200 m)
- Settlements: Mormon Lake and Lakeview

Mormon Lake is a shallow, intermittent lake located in northern Arizona in Pleasant Valley. With an average depth of only 10 ft (3.0 m), the surface area of the lake is extremely volatile and fluctuates seasonally. When full, the lake has a surface area of about 12 square miles (31 km^{2}), making it the largest natural lake in Arizona. In particularly dry times, the lake has been known to dry up, leaving behind a remnant marsh.

The surrounding area, which lies within Coconino National Forest, established in 1908, is part of the largest continuous stand of ponderosa pine in North America, often hosting campers and hikers. The lake itself is occasionally stocked with fish species such as bullhead catfish and northern pike, but due to its intermittent nature, it may contain few or no fish following dry seasons.

The name of the lake commemorates Mormon settlers who migrated to northern Arizona in the 1870s. The settlers, who located their main communities along the Little Colorado River, established various cottage industries in Pleasant Valley: a sawmill in 1876, a dairy in 1878, and a tannery in 1879. All were abandoned when the Little Colorado colonies were disbanded. The Coconino National Forest archaeologists recorded the remains of the mill site, little more than a foundation and piles of rocks, about 5 miles (8.0 km) southeast of Mormon Lake, in 1978.

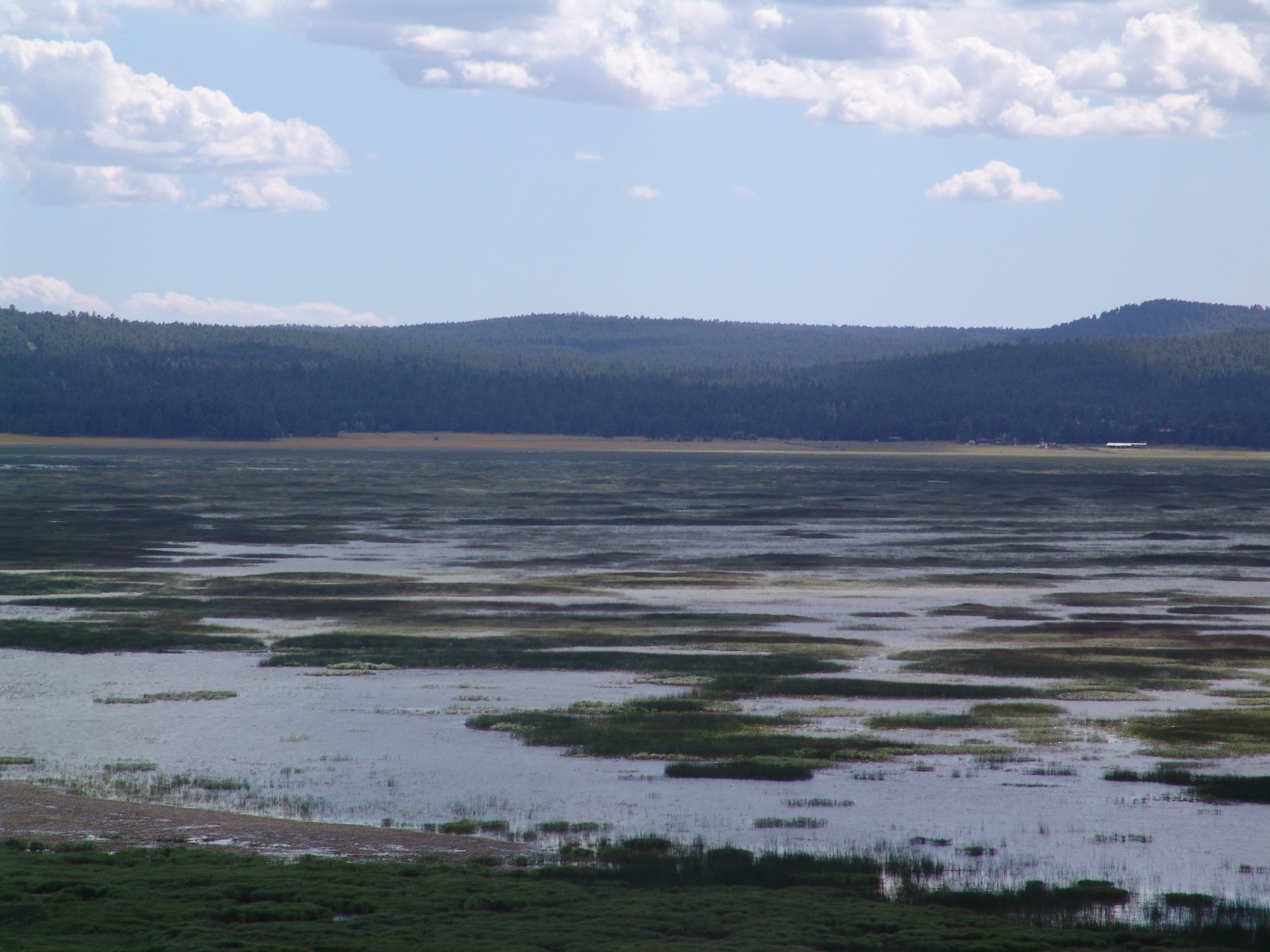
Mormon Lake, Arizona in late summer.

Two small settlements, Mormon Lake Village and Lakeview, were developed along the lakeshore in wetter years, but lie a distance south of the average shoreline. On the north and west bluffs overlooking the lake are over 80 private USFS recreation residences in four tracts named, north to south, Rockledge, Pilgrim Playgrond, Dairy Springs, Montezuma Lodge, and Double Springs. They are built on National Forest parcels, and are not Coconino County subdivisions. While these are generally used as summer homes; some may be occupied through the heavy winter snows, but water must be hauled-in with more consideration as their residential water storage is not winterized. The Forest Service operates older standard, "nostalgic" public campgrounds at Double Springs and Dairy Springs.

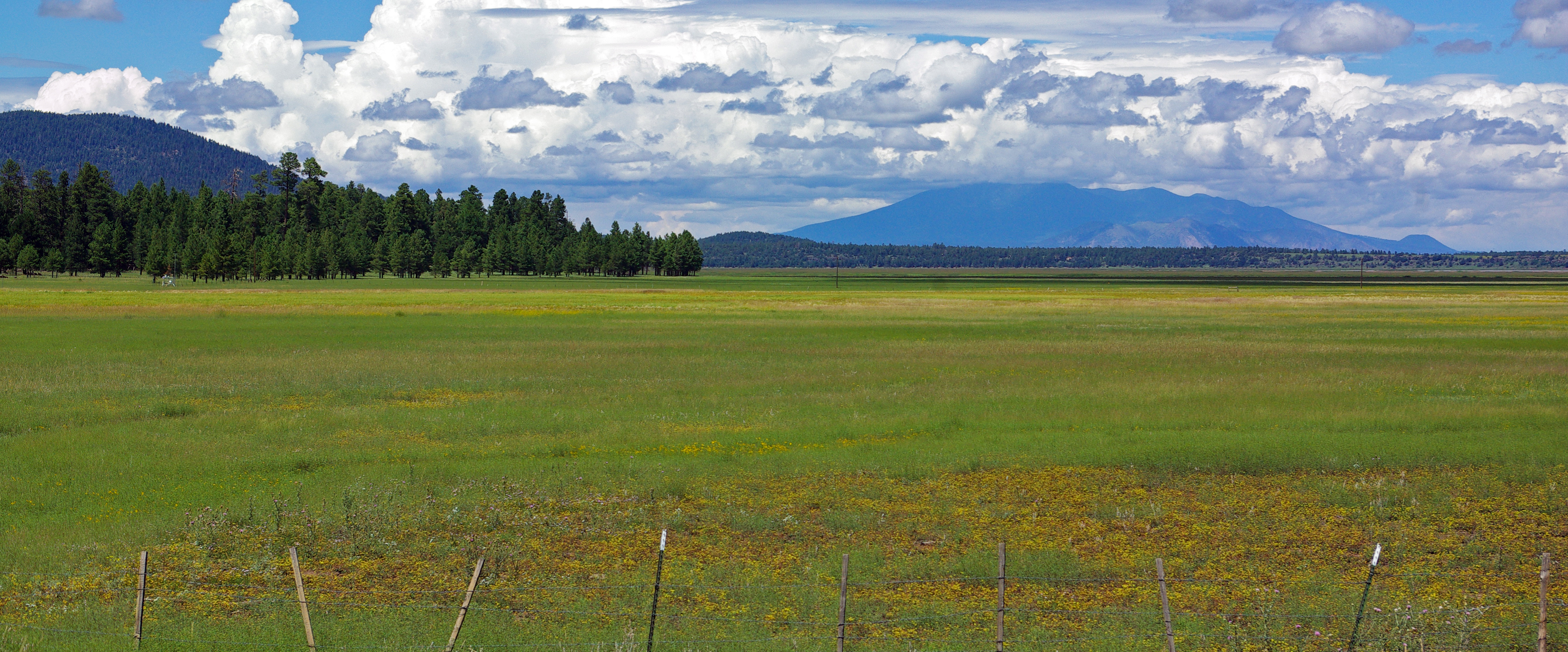
San Francisco Peaks viewed from the meadows at Mormon Lake, summer monsoon 2010
