= Nahom =

Place in the Book of Mormon

Nahom (/ˈneɪhəm/) is a place referenced in the Book of Mormon (1 Nephi 16:34) as one of the stops on the Old World segment of Lehi's journey. This location is referred to as the place where Ishmael is buried. It was also at this location that the path of Lehi's journey changed from a southern to an eastern direction before continuing toward the coast and the land Bountiful (1 Nephi 17:1). (See Archaeology and the Book of Mormon.)

== Nahom in the Book of Mormon ==
In 1 Nephi 16, Lehi receives the Liahona and his group departs from the Valley of Lemuel. After traveling for four days in "nearly a south-southeast direction" they make camp in a place they name "Shazer." They continue to travel in the "same direction" for "many days" with the Liahona as a guide (1 Nephi 16). Verses 34 and 35 read:

And it came to pass that Ishmael died, and was buried in the place which was called Nahom. And it came to pass that the daughters of Ishmael did mourn exceedingly, because of the loss of their father, and because of their afflictions in the wilderness; and they did murmur against my father, because he had brought them out of the land of Jerusalem, saying: Our father is dead; yea, and we have wandered much in the wilderness, and we have suffered much affliction, hunger, thirst, and fatigue; and after all these sufferings we must perish in the wilderness with hunger.

In the next four verses, the dissenters plot to kill Lehi and Nephi, but the threat is not carried out. The next verse reports that Lehi's group has resumed their journey and changed the direction of their travel "eastward" (1 Nephi 17:1).

=== Ancient frankincense trails ===
Some LDS scholars believe that Lehi's group followed the ancient frankincense trails in the northern part of Yemen at times during the initial leg of their journey (Reynolds 1997). The location of NHM is near the main junction of these ancient trails at a point where the trails veer to the east. According to the Book of Mormon, prior to their arrival at Nahom, the travelers had been moving in a "south-southeast" direction (1 Nephi 16:13). It was at this location "Nahom" that the Book of Mormon states that the travelers made a significant change in direction "eastward" before continuing their journey toward the coast.

=== LDS research on the proposed location of Nahom ===
In 1976, it was originally speculated by LDS member Lynn M. Hilton that Nahom might correlate with the location of the village of Al Qunfudhah, in Saudi Arabia (Hilton & Hilton 1976). In 1978 LDS member Ross T. Christensen noted the existence of a location in Yemen called "Nehhm" on an early map produced by Carsten Niebuhr as the result of a scientific expedition sent out by King Frederick V of Denmark (Christensen 1978, p. 73). After doing extensive research over several years at the site in Yemen, the location of Nahom was associated with the existing location and tribal name NHM (usually vocalized as NIHM or NEHEM or NAHM) by LDS scholars Warren and Michaela Aston in 1994 (Aston & Aston 1994). LDS scholars now consider the location and tribal area of NHM in the Jawf Valley in Yemen (15° 51' 0" North, 44° 37' 0" East, GPS coordinates 15.88, 44.615) to be the only plausible location for the place referred to as Nahom in the Book of Mormon.

LDS scholars consider NHM to be one of the locations in the Arabian peninsula that they believe confirms Book of Mormon historicity in the Old World (Givens 2002, pp. 120–21). LDS member Terryl Givens states that the discovery of the altars "may thus be said to constitute the first actual archaeological evidence for the historicity of the Book of Mormon." This conclusion is based upon archaeological evidence and inscriptions recently found on altars at a specific location in Yemen which appear to correlate with the "place called Nahom" described in the book of 1 Nephi (Aston 2001, pp. 56–61),(Brown 1999, pp. 66–67). Nahom is one of only a very few locations mentioned in the Book of Mormon that the text implies had been named prior to contact with the Lehite travelers, in contrast to Lehi's normal application of the Middle Eastern practice of naming locations after family members (Givens 2002, p. 120).

==== Altars ====
The Bar'an Temple in Marib (70 miles (110 km) east of San'a in Yemen) was excavated by a German archaeological team led by Burkhard Vogt. Before excavation began, all that was visible at the Bar'an site were six columns projecting above the sand. The temple structure and many of the altars were found to be well preserved by the sand and desert climate (Aston 2001). One of the artifacts discovered at this location was an inscribed altar which has been dated to the seventh or sixth centuries BC. The first altar discovered was removed from the Bar'an site and placed in a traveling exhibit which began touring Europe in October 1997. Since that time, two additional altars bearing the same inscription mentioning NHM have been identified at the same temple site (Aston 2001).

Each of the altars is constructed of solid limestone. All three contain a dedication inscription, which is carved around all four sides of the altars in the South Arabian script of that period, and each bears the name of their donor: Bi'athar (Aston 2001). The first altar was dated to between the seventh and sixth centuries B.C by French researcher Christian Robin (Robin 1997, p. 144). Since Naw'um of the tribe of Nihm was the grandfather of Bi'athar, it is estimated that the Nihm tribal name must be at least two generations older than the altars themselves (Aston 2001).

== Nahom and linguistics ==
=== Early references to NHM ===
The name NHM denotes both a tribal region and a location in the southern part of Arabia. In 1763 a German surveyor and mapmaker named Carsten Niebuhr produced a map which contained the place name "Nehhm" at a location approximately twenty-five miles northeast of the Yemen capital Sana'a (Aston & Aston 1994, p. 5). In 1792 Robert Heron published a two-volume translation of Niebuhr's first work titled Niebuhr's Travels through Arabia and Other Countries in the East (Brown 2001). Niebuhr explained in his book: "I have had no small difficulty in writing down these names; both from the diversity of dialects in the country, and from the indistinct pronunciation of those from whom I was obliged to ask them." Niebuhr circles the boundaries of this area of Nehhm on the map; it covers an area of approximately 2,394 square miles (6,200 km^{2}).

==== Criticisms of connection ====
Critics claim that the connection is coincidental in nature, noting that Nahom may simply be a spelling variant of common Semitic words, including Biblical names, and thus by coincidence, other names in the region. Specific observations include the following (Vogel 2004, p. 609):

- It has been suggested that Joseph Smith simply created the name Nahom as a variant of the Biblical names Naham (1 Chron. 4:19), Nehum (Ne. 7:7) and Nahum (Na. 1:1).
- It is suggested that the pronunciation of NHM is unknown and may not relate to Nahom at all.
- The fact that the Book of Mormon does not explicitly mention contact with outsiders during Lehi's journey.

It has been said that the link between Nahom and Nehhm, as spelled in Niebuhr's work, is invalid because the vowels between the names Nahom and Nehhm do not match, stating that "only three of the five letters in Nehhm agree with the spelling Nahom. The second letter in Nehhm is e rather than a, and the fourth letter is h instead of o. The variant spellings of Nehem, Nehm, Nihm, Nahm and Naham, do not really help to solve the problem."
