= Irreantum (LDS movement) =

Word from The Book of Mormon meaning "many waters"

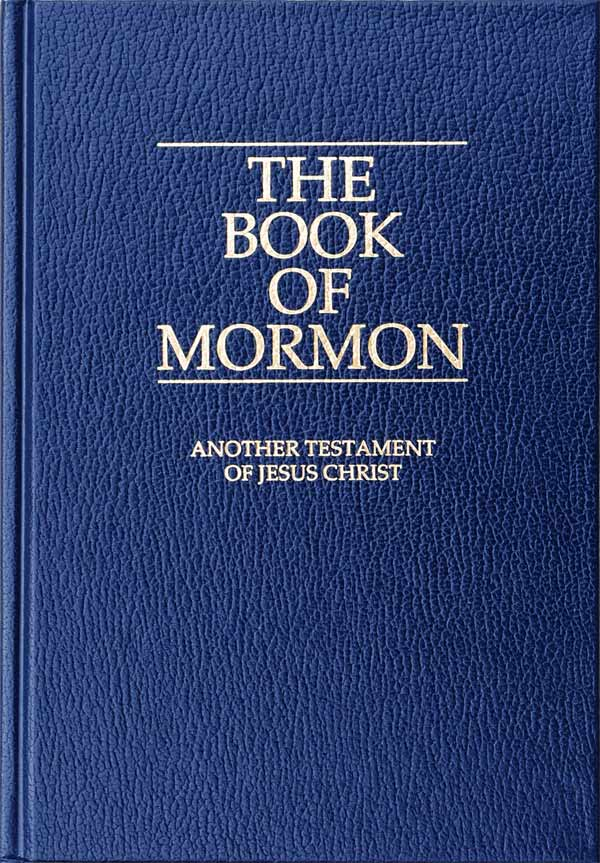
The Book of Mormon, one of the Mormon scriptures, also serves as the source of the reference to Irreantum

Irreantum (Deseret: 𐐆𐐡𐐀𐐈𐐤𐐓𐐊𐐣), in the beliefs of the Latter Day Saint movement (Mormons), is a word meaning "many waters". It appears in the 1st Book of Nephi, at the end of the description of Lehi's eight-year journey through the wilderness with his family. It is a subject of speculation among Mormon theologians, who place this reference on the so-called "small plates of Nephi". It also appears in publications critical of this religious tradition, particularly due to its name. Mormon apologists associate it with regions such as the Gulf of Oman or the Persian Gulf.

== Pronunciation ==
The pronunciation of this place name has sparked some interest among Mormon scholars, particularly historians focusing on the history of the Latter Day Saints. It has even been included in the pronunciation guide that has accompanied every English-language edition of The Book of Mormon since 1981. Sources indicate a significant difference between the contemporary common and preferred pronunciation and that of the early Utah settlement period for many names and terms from The Book of Mormon. However, there is no such difference in the case of Irreantum.

The original pronunciation, especially that used by Joseph Smith, holds some importance in studies of the proper names found in The Book of Mormon, although it is not considered a decisive factor in Mormon theology. The pronunciation used by Smith is determined through various means, including the 1869 edition of The Book of Mormon in the Deseret alphabet. The Deseret alphabet is a writing system created between 1847 and 1854 in Utah, commissioned by the highest church leaders, including Brigham Young.

There are records from those involved in the process known by Latter Day Saints as the translation of The Book of Mormon, shedding light on how Smith originally dealt with unfamiliar words. Hugh Nibley, citing the accounts of Smith's scribes, stated that Smith never pronounced such words, always resorting to spelling them out. Within the framework of Mormon theology, there is no effort to investigate the original pronunciation of this word, nor are such considerations made for Nephite names and words.

Moreover, Mormon theology highlights the inherent difficulty in determining the pronunciation of names and terms from this sacred Mormon scripture. This is because none of them were conveyed to Joseph Smith orally. The only possible exception is the name Moroni, as he is said to have introduced himself to Smith in a vision in 1823. From a doctrinal perspective, how the characters in The Book of Mormon pronounced these words remained unknown to the first Mormon leader.

== Spelling ==
During the process referred to by the Latter Day Saints as the translation of The Book of Mormon, Oliver Cowdery, one of the scribes assisting Joseph Smith, wrote the word in its currently known form. Shortly afterward, he corrected it by adding another a, likely thinking he had missed the letter while listening to Smith's dictation. Eventually, however, he realized there was no mistake and reverted to the original spelling, all within the original manuscript. The spelling Irreantum is also supported by other names or terms found in the text, such as Teancum. The manuscript submitted to the printer, and thus the first edition of this sacred Mormon text from 1830, used this spelling. It has appeared in all subsequent editions as well.

== Placement in the text of The Book of Mormon ==
In a strictly theological sense, it is mentioned in the section of the material referred to as the "smaller plates of Nephi". In official editions of The Book of Mormon, including the one in use since 1981, it appears directly only in the fifth verse of the seventeenth chapter of the First Book of Nephi. The currently used chapter and verse system dates back to 1879. In its first edition, published in 1830, the reference to Irreantum was part of the second chapter of the same book. It is estimated that the passage directly mentioning Irreantum was written on 10 June 1829.

== Role in the text of The Book of Mormon ==
This term appears in the sacred Mormon scripture at the end of the description of the eight-year journey of Lehi, his family, and their companions through the wilderness. Beyond that, little is known about it. Joseph Smith, when referring to Irreantum, mentioned the "Great Southern Ocean", which has been emphasized by much later Mormon apologetics.

== In Mormon theology and studies of The Book of Mormon ==
The existence of Irreantum has not been confirmed by external sources. However, various locations have been proposed that might correspond to it in the context of Middle Eastern geography. It has been openly acknowledged that these efforts cannot yield definitive results due to the complete lack of mentions in independent source materials.

Attempts to situate it within a specific geographical context have a long history, extending back to the first systematic encyclopedic works associated with this part of the Mormon canon. These efforts also encompass speculations made by members of the two main Mormon denominations. George Reynolds, in his 1891 publication A Dictionary of The Book of Mormon, Comprising Its Biographical, Geographical and Other Proper Names, mentioned an area on the eastern coast of the Arabian Peninsula, specifically the Gulf of Oman or the Persian Gulf. Alvin Knisley, from the Reorganized Church of Jesus Christ of Latter Day Saints, agreed with this conclusion in his 1909 Dictionary of The Book of Mormon, limiting himself to a general conclusion about the eastern coast of the Arabian Peninsula. A contemporary commentary, on the other hand, refers to an area in the northwest Indian Ocean.

Linguists associated with The Church of Jesus Christ of Latter-day Saints have extensively considered the etymology of the name of this area. They generally pointed to its Semitic or Egyptian origin, adding that it might derive from some South Semitic language. However, they did not rule out various possibilities, primarily for theological reasons.

Irreantum is a rather unique term in the study of The Book of Mormon. Among the 188 proper names identified in the text of this sacred Mormon scripture, only six (including Irreantum, as well as deseret and rameumptom) received translations within the text itself. Speculation arose that it must have been either a new Nephite word that was still relatively unknown to the audience of the text recorded on the smaller plates or a loanword. There was also contemplation about at which stage of the editorial process this translation might have entered the text. The assumption leaned toward it occurring during the creation of its English version, thus attributing to it a inspired origin, positing within the framework of theology that God conveyed it to Joseph Smith.

== In the criticism of The Book of Mormon ==
Irreantum is mocked by critics of Mormonism as one of the words invented by Smith. The use of this area or its name in the critique of The Book of Mormon is not a new phenomenon. Already in 1917, Walter Franklin Prince, in an article published in the American Journal of Psychology titled Psychological Tests for the Authorship of The Book of Mormon, included it in his analysis of the environmental factors that he believed influenced the creation of the Mormon sacred text. He particularly pointed to the influences of Freemasonry and the political activity of anti-Masonry, aspects that were simultaneously present in Joseph Smith's environment during the time when this text was being developed and prepared for publication.

== In Mormon culture ==
Regardless of etymological and theological speculations, Irreantum has found its place in Mormon culture. It is the name of a literary publication issued by the Association for Mormon Letters, which was initially launched in March 1999 and later resumed in 2018.

== Bibliography ==
- Huchel, Frederick M. (2000). "The Deseret Alphabet as an Aid in Pronouncing Book of Mormon Names". Journal of Book of Mormon Studies. 9 (1). Brigham Young University. ISSN 2168-3158.
- Woodger, Mary Jane (2000). "How the Guide to English Pronunciation of Book of Mormon Names Came About". Journal of Book of Mormon Studies. 9 (1). Brigham Young University. ISSN 2168-3158.
- Hoskisson, Paul Y.; Hauglid, Brian M.; Gee, John (2002). "What's in a Name? Irreantum". Journal of Book of Mormon Studies. 11 (1). Brigham Young University. ISSN 2168-3158.
- Ludlow, Daniel H., ed. (1992). Encyclopedia of Mormonism. New York: Macmillan Publishing. ISBN 978-0-02-904040-9.
- Reynolds, George (1891). A Dictionary of the Book of Mormon, Comprising Its Biographical, Geographical and Other Proper Names. Salt Lake City: Joseph Hyrum Perry.
- Hyde, Paul Nolan (2015). A Comprehensive Commentary of the First Book of Nephi. Orem: Parrish Press.
