= Jaredite kings =

Monarchs described in the Book of Mormon

Jaredite kings are a series of monarchs described in the Book of Mormon, comprising chapters 6–15 of the Book of Ether. According to that narrative, as death was approaching, Jared^{2} and his brother gathered together the Jaredite people to ask them what they desired of them before they died. The people requested that they anoint one of their sons as king. This was grievous to them, and the brother of Jared^{2} remarked that "surely this thing leadeth into captivity." Despite his brother's misgivings, Jared^{2} pressed him to allow the establishment of a Jaredite kingship, at which request the brother of Jared^{2} yielded.

The people chose Pagag, the firstborn of the brother of Jared^{2}. Pagog refused. The people then wished to force him to be king but the brother of Jared^{2} would not allow that. They suggested Jared^{2}'s sons, Jacom, Gilgah, and Mahah, but each refused to be king. Jared^{2}'s youngest son Orihah finally agreed to be king. Thus began the institution of monarchy among the Jaredites.

In the following compendium, the terms righteous, wicked, unrighteous, et al. derive from Welch and Welch designations.

== Early kings ==
1. Orihah, first Jaredite king, fourth son of Jared^{2}. Walked humbly, executed righteous judgment. Fathered 31 sons and daughters, including Kib.^{,}
2. Kib, righteous son of Orihah, father of Corihor^{1}, who took him into captivity, and of Shule, who freed him and restored him to his throne.^{,}
3. Corihor^{1}, rebel son of Kib (and brother to Shule), who later repented of his rebellion. Fathered Noah^{2} and Cohor^{1}, both of whom then rebelled against him.
4. Shule, righteous early Jaredite king. Born in captivity after brother Corihor^{1} usurped kingdom from their father Kib. Upon maturity, came to hill Ephraim to molten swords, armed followers, restored kingdom to his father. Eventually became king, executed righteous judgment. Nephew Noah^{2} rebelled, Shule's sons, including Omer, put down rebellion. Cohor^{2} rebelled and was also slain.^{,}

== Divided kingdom ==
Kingdom of Noah/Cohor^{2}

1. Cohor^{1}, unrighteous king, son of Corihor^{1} and brother of Noah^{2}. He joined Noah^{2}, with "all his brethren and many of the people" to establish a rival kingdom to Shule's. No further references were made, but he seems to have been influential, as Noah^{2} later named son after him, and name was passed down to end of Jaredite lineage.
2. Noah^{2}, unrighteous son of Corihor^{1}. Rebelled against his father, battled Shule, obtained part of the kingdom including the land of first inheritance and Moron, slain by sons of Shule. Father of Cohor^{2}.
3. Cohor^{2}, wicked early Jaredite king slain by Shule. Son of Noah^{2}, father of Nimrod^{2}.
4. Nimrod^{2}, who turned over the kingdom to Shule and received great favors in return. Son of Cohor^{2}, and grandson of Noah^{2}.

Kingdom of Shule

1. Shule, son of Kib, righteous king

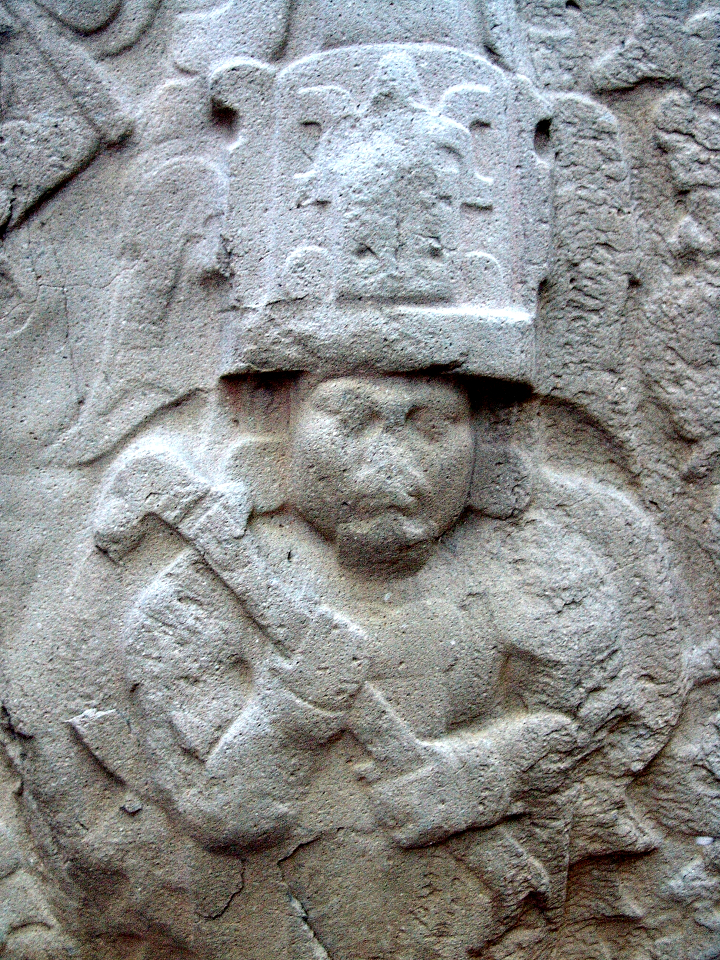

== Reunited kingdom ==
1. Shule, son of Kib, righteous
2. Omer, righteous Jaredite king, son of Shule and father to Emer, Jared^{3}, Esrom, and Coriantumr^{1}. Overthrown by Jared^{3}, spent half of days in captivity, until sons regained kingdom for him. Jared^{3} and his daughter plotted with Akish to overthrow Omer's kingdom. Warned by God, escaped with family. Later joined by great-grandsons Nimrah and brothers, who restored his kingdom.
3. Jared^{3}, unrighteous king who seized kingdom from his father Omer. Brother of Esrom and Coriantumr^{1}, who retook the kingdom and restored it to their father. Worked in secret combinations with his daughter and Akish to regain kingdom. Slain by Akish's band.
4. Akish, wicked Jaredite son of Kimnor, and erstwhile friend of Omer, who worked in secret combinations. Plotted with Jared^{3} and his daughter to overthrow Omer. Obtained kingdom by slaying Jared^{3}. Jealous of his own son, imprisoned and starved him, which angered another son Nimrah, and initiated a years-long war between Akish and his sons.
5. Omer, restored to throne after civil war of Akish nearly destroyed entire kingdom.
6. Emer, enjoyed a peaceful, prosperous reign of 62 years, executed righteous judgment, and saw Jesus Christ. Son of Omer and father of Coriantum^{1}.
7. Coriantum^{1}, righteous city builder who married in old age. Son of Emer, father of Com^{1}.
8. Com^{1}, righteous son of Coriantum^{1} and father of Heth^{1}; dethroned by his son.
9. Heth^{1}, unrighteous king who rebelled, slew his father, and brought about famine, causing many followers to emigrate to Zarahemla. Son of Com^{1}, and father of Shez^{1}.
10. Shez^{1}, righteous king who outlived rebellious namesake son and rebuilt kingdom. Son or descendant of Heth^{1}, father of Riplakish and Shez^{2}.
11. Riplakish, unrighteous king who heavily taxed people, executed those who didn't labor, engaged in whoredoms, and was killed in uprising. Son of Shez^{1} and brother of Shez^{2}. After a break in continuity of the kingdom, succeeded by descendant Morianton^{1}.

== Restored kingdom ==
1. Morianton^{1}, just king in lineage of Ether, who re-established kingdom after many generations and eased burden of the people, though he himself was cut off from God. Descendant of Riplakish; father of Kim and at least one other son.
2. Kim, rebellious son of Morianton^{1}, who was taken into captivity by his own brother. Father of Levi^{2}.
3. Brother of Kim, unrighteous middle Jaredite who rebelled against Kim and subjected him and his descendants to captivity. Son of Morianton^{1}.
4. Levi^{2}, righteous king who fought way out of captivity and ruled justly. Father of Corom, and son of Kim.
5. Corom, king who did good for his people and fathered many children, including Kish. Son of Levi^{2}.
6. Kish, king about whom little is known; father of Lib^{1} and son of Corom, two righteous kings.
7. Lib^{1}, righteous king who rid land of serpents and became a great hunter. Son of Kish, and father of Hearthom.
8. Hearthom, righteous king who lost kingdom after 24 years and fell into captivity. Son of Lib^{1}, and father of Heth^{2}.

== Rule of usurper kings ==
1. Usurper kings (unknown number)
2. Amgid, final usurper king, overthrown by Com^{2}.

== Kings in captivity under the usurpers ==
1. Heth^{2}, Jaredite in line of kingly succession, who lived in captivity all his days. Son of Hearthom, and ancestor of Aaron^{2}.
2. Aaron^{2}, son or descendant of Jaredite king Heth^{2} , in line of kingly succession, who spent his life in captivity. Father of Amnigaddah.
3. Amnigaddah, captive Jaredite, in line of kingly succession. Father of Coriantum^{2}, and son of Aaron^{2}.
4. Coriantum^{2}, captive middle Jaredite in line of kingly succession. Father of Com^{2}, son of Amnigaddah.

== Restoration of lineage ==
1. Com^{2}, righteous king who drew away half to kingdom, then battled against Amgid for remainder of kingdom; fought in vain against robbers. Father of Shiblom^{1} (Shiblon) and at least one other son, son of Coriantum^{2}.
2. Shiblom^{1} (also Shiblon), righteous late Jaredite king and son of Com^{2}, who warred against rebel brother and was slain. Father of Seth^{2}.
3. Seth^{2}, Jaredite in line of kingly succession, who lived in captivity after his father was slain. Son of Shiblom^{1}, father of Ahah.
4. Ahah, an iniquitous king who led a short life. Son of Seth^{2}, and father or ancestor of Ethem.
5. Ethem, wicked king whose people hardened their hearts. Son or descendant of Ahah, father of Moron.
6. Moron, king who reigned during a time of great wickedness and turmoil, and was himself wicked. Lost half his kingdom for many years because of a rebellion and, after regaining kingdom, was completely overthrown and lived out his life in captivity. Son of Ethem, father of Coriantor, grandfather or ancestor of the prophet Ether.
7. Coriantor, Jaredite in line of kingship, son of Moron, father or ancestor of Ether. Although his father had been king, Coriantor "dwelt in captivity all his days".

== Final change of lineage ==
1. Usurper, a descendant of the brother of Jared and a "mighty man" of unknown connection to Moron, whom he overthrew, or to Coriantor, whom he kept in captivity.
2. Coriantumr^{2}, last Jaredite king and last Jaredite survivor. Fought Shared and warred against Gilead, Lib^{2}, and Shiz. Lived 9 months with people of Zarahemla (c. 130 BC).

== Civil war under the reign of Coriantumr^{2} ==
1. Shared, military leader and brother of Gilead, who battled Coriantumr^{2} and sons for control of kingdom. For three days engaged in combat with Coriantumr^{2} at battle of Gilgal, severely wounding him but losing own life in the process.
2. Gilead, brother of Shared, who slew part of army of Coriantumr^{2} when they were drunk, and took over Coriantumr^{2}'s throne.
3. Gilead’s High Priest, who murdered Gilead as he sat upon his throne, and who was in turn murdered by Lib^{2} in a secret pass.
4. Lib^{2}, wicked king and brother of Shiz, who fought Coriantumr^{2} for control of kingdom, worked in secret combinations, murdered Gilead, and was killed by Coriantumr^{2}. Lib^{2} was largest man in kingdom.
5. Shiz, military leader and brother of Lib^{2}. Swore to avenge brother's blood, slew women and children, burnt cities, brutalized civilization. Coriantumr^{2} fought back, exchanged bitter correspondence with Shiz, re-took battlefield, and beheaded him. Their battle lead to the end of Jaredite civilization.

== See also ==
- Book of Mormon rulers
- List of Book of Mormon people
