= Valley of Nimrod =

In the Book of Mormon, the Valley of Nimrod is the place where the Jaredites gathered with their friends and family after God confounded the languages at the Tower of Babel.

== Background ==
The Book of Ether tells the story of the Jaredites, who were present at the tower. Ether records:

"Jared came forth with his brother and their families, with some others and their families, from the great tower, at the time the Lord confounded the language of the people, and swore in his wrath that they should be scattered upon all the face of the earth; and according to the word of the Lord the people were scattered...

And it came to pass that the Lord...said unto [the Brother of Jared]:

Go to and gather together thy flocks, both male and female, of every kind; and also of the seed of the earth of every kind; and thy families; and also Jared thy brother and his family; and also thy friends and their families, and the friends of Jared and their families.

And when thou hast done this thou shalt ago at the head of them down into the valley which is northward."

== Activity in the valley ==
Once in the Valley of Nimrod, the Jaredites gathered flocks, caught birds, collected honeybees, stored seeds, and prepared watertight containers for the journey ahead. The brother of Jared then talked with God and received directions that led the Jaredites across the ocean to the "promised land."
