= Shiz =

Jaredite military leader

In the Book of Mormon, Shiz (/ʃɪz/) is a Jaredite military leader who was beheaded by Coriantumr. Since the nineteenth century, the account of Shiz's death in the Book of Ether has been claimed by critics to be an error in the Book of Mormon.

== Biography ==
An army led by Shiz (the brother of Lib) pursued an army led by Coriantumr, in the process destroying many cities and killing all their inhabitants. The struggle between the two armies became so protracted "that the whole face of the land was covered with the bodies of the dead." Nevertheless, Shiz continued to fight, having sworn to avenge the death of his brother. Shiz pursued Coriantumr to the seashore where their troops fought a three-day battle. Coriantumr's troops twice defeated the troops of Shiz, but in the third encounter, Shiz wounded Coriantumr severely, giving him many deep wounds. Coriantumr was "carried away as though he were dead," but Shiz had lost so many people that he ordered his army not to pursue the rival army.

After two million of Coriantumr's people had been killed, Coriantumr offered his throne to Shiz in exchange for peace. Shiz responded that he would only stop the bloodshed if Coriantumr allowed Shiz to kill him. The two sides attacked each other once again, and the final battle was fought at the hill Ramah (Cumorah), where every Jaredite joined in the battle except for the prophet Ether. The people fought each other many days with neither side prevailing. In the end all the Jaredites were killed except for Coriantumr and Shiz. Shiz fainted from the loss of blood, and Coriantumr cut off his head.

The Book of Mormon concludes the story of Shiz's death at the hands of Coriantumr with the words: "And it came to pass that after he [Coriantumr] had smitten off the head of Shiz, that Shiz raised up on his hands and fell; and after that he had struggled for breath, he died."

== Apologetic response ==
Concerning the description of Shiz's death, the Mormon Foundation for Apologetic Information & Research argues that, based on modern neuroanatomy, the account of Shiz's death is actually "a realistic touch" and represents "a phenomenon that went unrecognized in the medical literature of the modern era until 1898. It is one more mark of the Book of Mormon's status as genuine history."

When Shiz's head was cut off, he propped himself up and struggled before falling limp; Gary M. Hadfield, a Latter-day Saint professor of neuropathology at Brigham Young University, publishing in a Mormon apologist journal, concludes that this is because Coriantumr probably did not cut his head clean off, leading to a contraction of the nerves. This would have caused his body to move, even after he was dead. Protestant Chris Thomas points out that the circumstance of two beheadings in the Book of Ether, one at the beginning and one at the end, is a literary device called an inclusio.
