= KIB =

KIB, Kib, or KiB may refer to:

- Kib (Jaredite king), one of the Jaredite kings in the Book of Mormon
- Kibibit (Kib)
- Kibibyte (KiB)
- Kodiak Island Borough, Alaska, a borough in the U.S. state of Alaska
- Kunming Institute of Botany
- Kuwait International Bank, an Islamic bank based in Kuwait
