= 16 Stones =

- Directed by: Brian Brough
- Screenplay by: Brittany Wiscombe
- Release date: 2014
- Country: United States
- Language: English

16 Stones is a 2014 American film that takes place in 1830s Missouri. It concerns the 16 stones of the Jaredites in the tradition of the Church of Jesus Christ of Latter-day Saints.

The film was directed by Brian Brough. It stars Brad Johnson as Joseph Smith, Mason D. Davis as blacksmith James, Ilene Wood as James's mother, Ben Isaacs as missionary Thomas, and Nathan Norman as the villain Mobber. Norman says the film had a profound effect on his spirituality.
