= Tower of Babel =

Mythical structure in the Hebrew Bible

- מִגְדַּל בָּבֶל
- The Tower of Babel by Pieter Bruegel the Elder (1563)

General information
- Type: Tower
- Location: Eridu, Babylon or Nineveh

Height
- Height: See § Height

The biblical story of the Tower of Babel (Note: /ˈbeɪbəl, ˈbæbəl/ BAY-bəl, BA-bəl; Hebrew: מִגְדַּל בָּבֶל, romanized: Miḡdal Bāḇel; Ancient Greek: Πύργος τῆς Βαβέλ, romanized: Pýrgos tês Babél; Latin: Turris Babel.) is an origin myth and parable recorded in Genesis 11 (chapter 11 of the Book of Genesis) meant to explain the existence of different languages and cultures.

According to the story, a united human race speaking a single language migrates to Shinar (Lower Mesopotamia), (Note: Hebrew: שִׁנְעָר, romanized: Šinʿār; Ancient Greek: Σενναάρ, romanized: Sennaár) where they agree to build a great city with a tower that would reach the sky. Yahweh, observing these efforts and remarking on humanity's power in unity, confounds their speech so that they can no longer understand each other and scatters them around the world, leaving the city unfinished.

Modern scholars have commonly associated the Tower of Babel with known historical structures and accounts, particularly from ancient Mesopotamia. The most widely attributed inspiration is Etemenanki, a ziggurat dedicated to the god Marduk in Babylon, which in Hebrew was called Babel. A similar story is also found in the ancient Sumerian legend, Enmerkar and the Lord of Aratta, which describes events and locations in southern Mesopotamia.

== Etymology ==
The phrase "Tower of Babel" does not appear in Genesis nor elsewhere in the Bible; it is always "the city and the tower" (Note: אֶת הָעִיר וְאֶת הַמִּגְדָּל, ʾeṯ hā-ʿîr wəʾeṯ ha-mmiḡdāl, see Genesis 11:4–5) or just "the city". (Note: הָעִיר, hāʿîr, see Genesis 11:8) The original derivation of the name Babel, which is the Hebrew name for Babylon, is uncertain. The native Akkadian name of the city was Bāb-ilim, meaning 'gate of God'. However, that form and interpretation are now usually thought to derive from Akkadian folk etymology applied to an earlier form of the name, Babilla, of unknown meaning and probably non-Semitic origin.

According to the narrative story in Genesis 11, the city received the name "Babel" from the Hebrew verb bālal, meaning to jumble or to confuse, after Yahweh distorted the common language of humankind. According to Encyclopædia Britannica, this reflects word play due to the Hebrew terms for Babylon and "to confuse" having similar pronunciation.

== Analysis ==
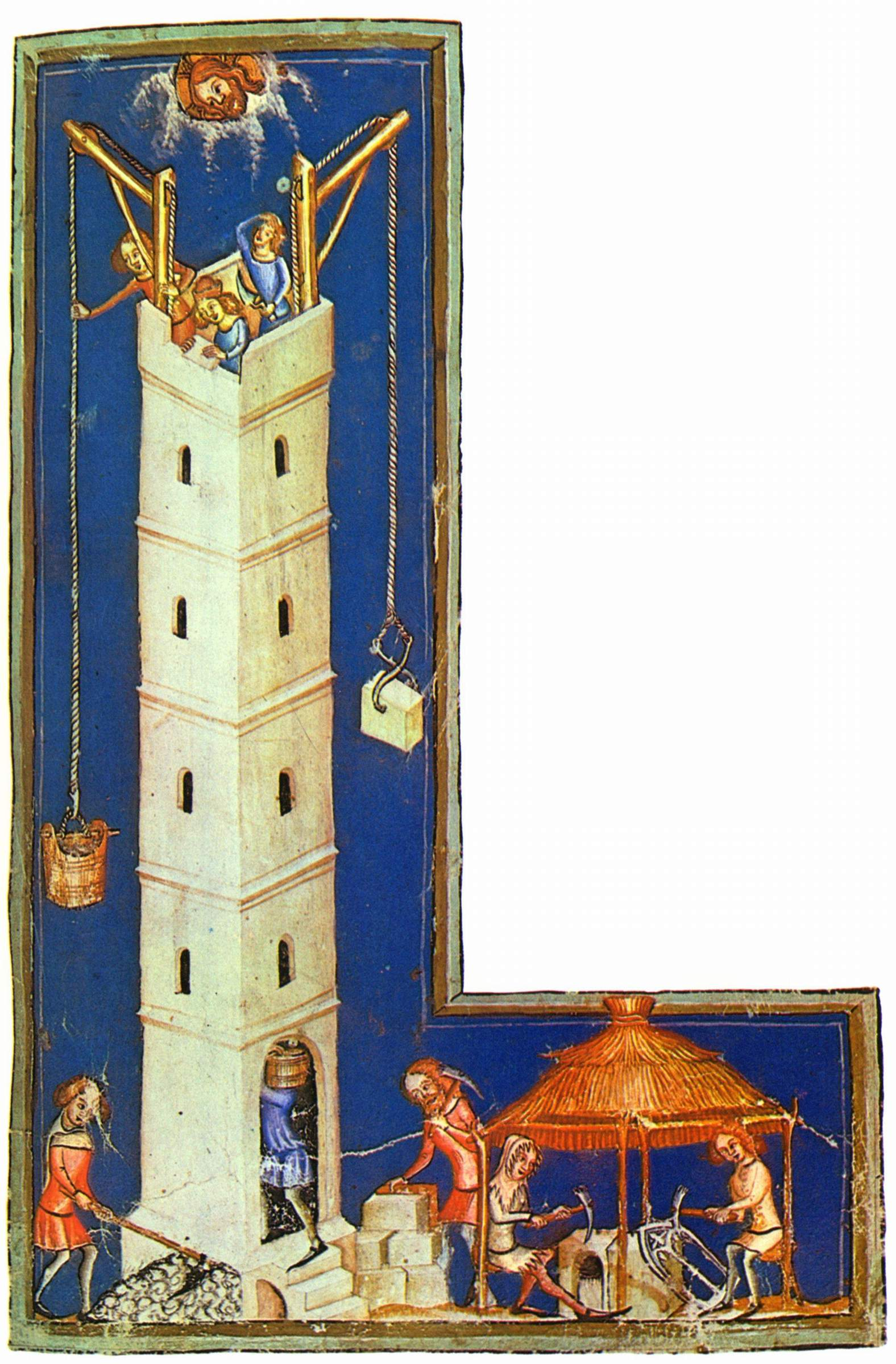
Late medieval German depiction of the Tower being constructed, from a manuscript of Rudolf von Ems' Weltchronik, cgm 5 fol. 29r (c. 1370s)

=== Genre ===
The Tower of Babel is a type of myth known as an etiology, which is intended to explain the origin of a custom, ritual, geographical feature, name, or other phenomenon—namely the origins of the multiplicity of languages. The confusion of tongues (Latin: confusio linguarum) resulting from the construction of the Tower of Babel accounts for the fragmentation of human languages: God was concerned that humans had blasphemed by building the tower to avoid a second flood and so God brought into existence multiple languages, rendering humanity unable to understand each other. Phillip Sherman noted that Yahweh appears as a curious God, and must be on-scene to be informed about human activities, as well as feeling threatened by the building of the tower, potential of humanity, or what it represents to his intentions for creation.

Prior to this event, humanity was stated to speak a single language, although the preceding Genesis 10:5 states that the descendants of Japheth, Gomer, and Javan dispersed "with their own tongues". Augustine of Hippo explained this apparent contradiction by arguing that the story "without mentioning it, goes back to tell how it came about that the one language common to all men was broken up into many tongues". Modern scholarship has traditionally held that the two chapters were written by different sources, the former by the Priestly source and the latter by the Jahwist. However, that theory has been debated among scholars in recent years.

=== Themes ===
The story's theme of competition between God and humans appears elsewhere in Genesis, in the story of Adam and Eve in the Garden of Eden. The first century Jewish interpretation by Flavius Josephus explains the construction of the tower as a hubristic act of defiance against God ordered by the arrogant tyrant Nimrod.

There have been some contemporary challenges to this classical interpretation, with emphasis placed on the explicit motive of cultural and linguistic homogeneity mentioned in the narrative (11:1, 4, 6); this reading of the text sees God's actions not as a punishment for pride, but as an etiology of cultural differences, presenting Babel as the cradle of civilization. Another view is by Ellen van Wolde, who notes that the ambitions of the tower builders were not directed against Yahweh. Arie van der Kooij argues that it is not about human sin nor punishment, but analogous to Mesopotamian etiological literature and addressing the present circumstances of the authors.

Genesis 11:8 reports that the construction of the tower was incomplete when its builders were dispersed around the world. Verse 5, however, has the LORD visiting the tower "which the children of man had built" (perfect tense: בּנוּ). Keil and Delitzsch suggest that the tower was therefore "finished up to a certain point" at this stage.

=== Height ===
The Book of Genesis does not specify the tower's height; the phrase "its top in the sky" (11:4) was an idiom for impressive height, rather than implying arrogance. The Book of Jubilees 10:21 mentions the tower's height as being 5,433 cubits and 2 palms (2,484 m; 8,150 ft; 1.54 mi), about three times the height of Burj Khalifa.

The apocryphal Third Apocalypse of Baruch mentions that the "tower of strife" reached a height of 463 cubits (211.8 m; 695 ft), taller than any structure built in human history until the construction of the Eiffel Tower in 1889, which is 324 metres (1,060 ft) in height.

Gregory of Tours writing c. 594, quotes the earlier historian Orosius (c. 417) as saying the tower was "laid out foursquare on a very level plain. Its wall, made of baked brick cemented with pitch" is 50 cubits in width by 200 cubits in length (23 by 91.5 m; 75 by 300 ft), and 470 stades (82.72 km; 51.40 mi) in circumference. A stade was an ancient Greek unit of length, based on the circumference of a typical sports stadium of the time which was about 176 metres (577 ft). The description continues, "Twenty-five gates are situated on each side, which make in all one hundred. The doors of these gates, which are of wonderful size, are cast in bronze. The same historian tells many other tales of this city, and says: 'Although such was the glory of its building still it was conquered and destroyed.'"

A typical medieval account is given by Giovanni Villani (1300): he relates that "it measured eighty miles [130 km] round, and it was already 4,000 paces high [5.92 km; 3.68 mi] and 1,000 paces thick, and each pace is three of our feet." The 14th-century traveler John Mandeville also included an account of the tower and reported that its height had been 64 furlongs (13 km; 8 mi), according to the local inhabitants.

The 17th-century historian Verstegan provides yet another figure – quoting Isidore, he says that the tower was 5,164 paces high (7.6 km; 4.7 mi), and quoting Josephus that the tower was wider than it was high, more like a mountain than a tower. He also quotes unnamed authors who say that the spiral path was so wide that it contained lodgings for workers and animals, and other authors who claim that the path was wide enough to have fields for growing grain for the animals used in the construction.

In his book, Structures: Or Why Things Don't Fall Down, J. E. Gordon considers the height of the Tower of Babel. He wrote, "brick and stone weigh about 120 lb per cubic foot (2,000 kg per cubic metre) and the crushing strength of these materials is generally rather better than 6,000 lbs per square inch or 40 mega-pascals. Elementary arithmetic shows that a tower with parallel walls could have been built to a height of 2.1 km (1.3 mi) before the bricks at the bottom were crushed. However, by making the walls taper towards the top they ... could well have been built to a height where the men of Shinnar would run short of oxygen and had difficulty in breathing before the brick walls crushed beneath their own dead weight."

== Composition ==
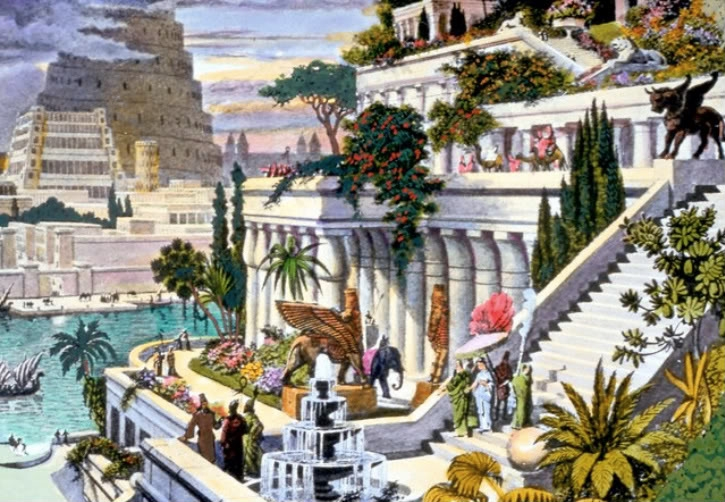
Hanging Gardens of Babylon (19th-century illustration), depicts the Tower of Babel in the background.

=== Story ===
The Tower of Babel story is very short, having only nine verses.

The Tower of Babel

Genesis 11:1-9 KJV

"1 And the whole earth was of one language, and of one speech. 2 And it came to pass, as they journeyed from the east, that they found a plain in the land of Shinar; and they dwelt there. 3 And they said one to another, Go to, let us make brick, and burn them thoroughly. And they had brick for stone, and slime had they for morter. 4 And they said, Go to, let us build us a city and a tower, whose top may reach unto heaven; and let us make us a name, lest we be scattered abroad upon the face of the whole earth. 5 And the LORD came down to see the city and the tower, which the children of men builded. 6 And the LORD said, Behold, the people is one, and they have all one language; and this they begin to do: and now nothing will be restrained from them, which they have imagined to do. 7 Go to, let us go down, and there confound their language, that they may not understand one another's speech. 8 So the LORD scattered them abroad from thence upon the face of all the earth: and they left off to build the city. 9 Therefore is the name of it called Babel; because the LORD did there confound the language of all the earth: and from thence did the LORD scatter them abroad upon the face of all the earth."

=== Authorship ===
Jewish and Christian tradition attributes the composition of the whole Pentateuch, which includes the story of the Tower of Babel, to Moses. Modern biblical scholarship rejects Mosaic authorship of the Pentateuch but is divided on the question of its authorship. Many scholars subscribe to a form of the documentary hypothesis, which argues that the Pentateuch is composed of multiple "sources" that were later merged. Scholars who favor this hypothesis, such as Richard Elliot Friedman, tend to see Genesis 11:1–9 as being composed by the J or Jahwist/Yahwist source.

Michael Coogan suggests that the intentional word play regarding the city of Babel, and the noise of the people's "babbling" is found in the Hebrew words as easily as in English, is considered typical of the Yahwist source. John Van Seters, who has put forth substantial modifications to the hypothesis, suggests that these verses are part of what he calls a "Pre-Yahwistic stage". Other scholars reject the documentary hypothesis, adhering to the supplementary or fragmentary models. The "minimalist" scholars tend to see the books of Genesis through 2 Kings as written by a single, anonymous author during the Hellenistic period.

=== Historicity ===
Biblical scholars see the Book of Genesis as mythological and not as an historical account of events. Genesis is described as beginning with historicized myth and ending with mythicized history. Nevertheless, the story of Babel can be interpreted in terms of its context: Elsewhere in Genesis, it is stated that Babel (LXX: Βαβυλών) formed part of Nimrod's kingdom, which is located in Lower Mesopotamia. The Bible does not specifically mention that Nimrod ordered the building of the tower, but many other sources have associated its construction with him. Genesis 11:9 attributes the Hebrew version of the name, Babel, to the verb balal, which means to confuse or confound in Hebrew. The first century Roman-Jewish author Flavius Josephus similarly explained that the name was derived from the Hebrew word Babel (בבל), meaning "confusion".

== Possible origins ==
=== Etemenanki ===
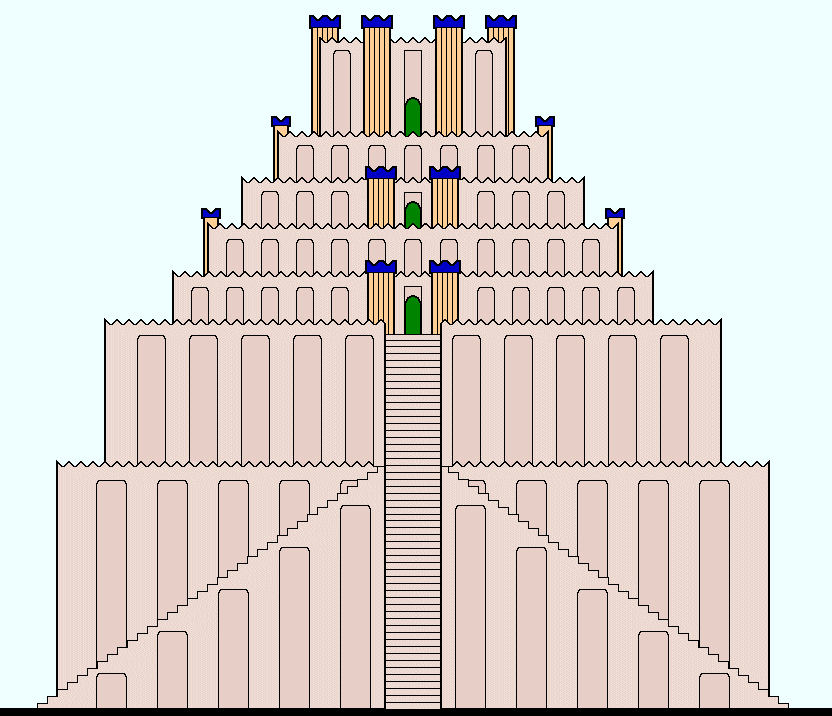
Reconstruction of the Etemenanki

Etemenanki (Sumerian: "temple of the foundation of heaven and earth") was the name of a ziggurat dedicated to Marduk in the city of Babylon. It was famously rebuilt by the 6th-century BCE Neo-Babylonian rulers Nabopolassar and Nebuchadnezzar II, but had fallen into disrepair by the time of Alexander the Great's conquests. He managed to move the tiles of the tower to another location, but his death stopped the reconstruction, and it was demolished during the reign of his successor Antiochus Soter. Greek historian Herodotus (c. 484 – c. 425 BC) wrote an account of the ziggurat in his Histories, which he called the "Temple of Zeus Belus".

According to modern scholars, the biblical story of the Tower of Babel was likely influenced by Etemenanki. Stephen L. Harris proposed this occurred during the Babylonian captivity. Isaac Asimov speculated that the authors of Genesis 11:1–9 were inspired by the existence of an apparently incomplete ziggurat at Babylon, and by the phonological similarity between Babylonian Bab-ilu, meaning "gate of God", and the Hebrew word balal, meaning "mixed", "confused", or "confounded". Other proposals in the past have been the ziggurats of Borsippa, Dur-Kurigazlu, Dur-Sharrukin, or the Tower of Esagil which has a mythological counterpart in the Enuma Elish that shares literary parallels with the Tower of Babel narrative. Thus, the story possibly serves as a polemic against Neo-Babylonian temple dedication practices to Marduk.

=== Mesopotamian analogues ===
There are similar stories to the Tower of Babel. In the Sumerian myth Enmerkar and the Lord of Aratta, Enmerkar of Uruk is building a massive ziggurat in Eridu and demands a tribute of precious materials from Aratta for its construction, at one point reciting an incantation imploring the god Enki to restore (or in Kramer's translation, to disrupt) the linguistic unity of the inhabited regions—named as Shubur, Hamazi, Sumer, Uri-ki (Akkad), and the Martu land, "the whole universe, the well-guarded people—may they all address Enlil together in a single language."

The Eridu Genesis, an ancient Sumerian flood myth, includes a passage about the unity of human speech before the gods intervened. During the Neo-Assyrian period, a fragmentary text found in Nineveh, from the library of Ashurbanipal (r. 668–627 BCE), which contains parts of the Eridu Genesis, along with the general interest Ashurbanipal's library had in preserving older traditions, suggest that these stories of language confusion and divine intervention were still relevant during this period.

This is further evidenced by the Neo-Assyrian divine punishment motif often found in royal inscriptions, which describe the gods punishing nations for their arrogance, particularly through destruction, scattering, or confusion—a theme seen in the Tower of Babel story.

In the annals of the Neo-Assyrian king Sennacherib (r. 705–681 BCE), he describes how the gods "confused the plans" of his enemies and scattered their forces, resulting in his victory and the destruction of Babylon in 689 BCE. These events may have influenced later biblical writers during the period of Babylonian captivity, who viewed the city’s fall as a divine act, reinforcing the idea that Babylon’s pride led to its downfall.

== Later literature ==
=== Book of Jubilees ===
The Book of Jubilees contains one of the most detailed accounts found anywhere of the Tower.

And they began to build, and in the fourth week they made brick with fire, and the bricks served them for stone, and the clay with which they cemented them together was asphalt which comes out of the sea, and out of the fountains of water in the land of Shinar. And they built it: forty and three years were they building it; its breadth was 203 bricks, and the height [of a brick] was the third of one; its height amounted to 5433 cubits and 2 palms, and [the extent of one wall was] thirteen stades [and of the other thirty stades].

— Jubilees 10:20–21, Robert Charles' 1913 translation

=== Pseudo-Philo ===
In Pseudo-Philo, the direction for the building is ascribed not only to Nimrod, who is made prince of the Hamites, but also to Joktan, as prince of the Semites, and to Phenech son of Dodanim, as prince of the Japhetites. Twelve men are arrested for refusing to bring bricks, including Abraham, Lot, Nahor, and several sons of Joktan. However, Joktan finally saves the twelve from the wrath of the other two princes.

=== Josephus' Antiquities of the Jews ===
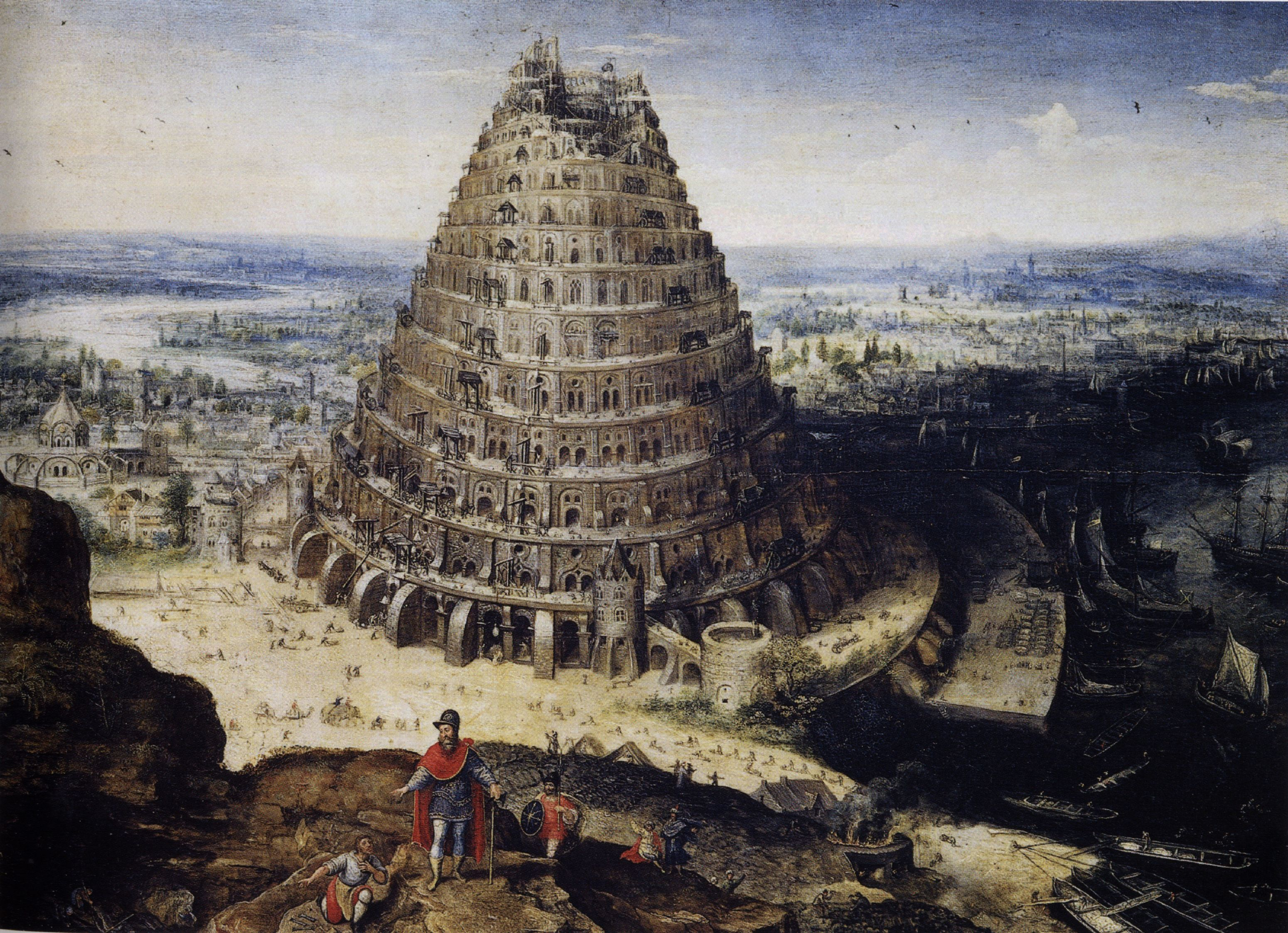
Tower of Babel, by Lucas van Valckenborch, 1594, Louvre Museum

The Jewish-Roman historian Flavius Josephus, in his Antiquities of the Jews (c. 94 CE), recounted history as found in the Hebrew Bible and mentioned the Tower of Babel. He wrote that it was Nimrod who had the tower built and that Nimrod was a tyrant who tried to turn the people away from God. In this account, God confused the people rather than destroying them because annihilation with a Flood had not taught them to be godly.

Now it was Nimrod who excited them to such an affront and contempt of God. He was the grandson of Ham, the son of Noah, a bold man, and of great strength of hand. He persuaded them not to ascribe it to God as if it were through his means they were happy, but to believe that it was their own courage which procured that happiness. He also gradually changed the government into tyranny, seeing no other way of turning men from the fear of God, but to bring them into a constant dependence on his power... Now the multitude were very ready to follow the determination of Nimrod and to esteem it a piece of cowardice to submit to God; and they built a tower, neither sparing any pains, nor being in any degree negligent about the work: and, by reason of the multitude of hands employed in it, it grew very high, sooner than any one could expect; but the thickness of it was so great, and it was so strongly built, that thereby its great height seemed, upon the view, to be less than it really was. It was built of burnt brick, cemented together with mortar, made of bitumen, that it might not be liable to admit water. When God saw that they acted so madly, he did not resolve to destroy them utterly, since they were not grown wiser by the destruction of the former sinners [in the Flood]; but he caused a tumult among them, by producing in them diverse languages, and causing that, through the multitude of those languages, they should not be able to understand one another. The place wherein they built the tower is now called Babylon, because of the confusion of that language which they readily understood before; for the Hebrews mean by the word Babel, confusion. The Sibyl also makes mention of this tower, and of the confusion of the language, when she says thus:—"When all men were of one language, some of them built a high tower, as if they would thereby ascend up to heaven; but the gods sent storms of wind and overthrew the tower, and gave everyone a peculiar language; and for this reason it was that the city was called Babylon."

=== Greek Apocalypse of Baruch ===
Third Apocalypse of Baruch (or 3 Baruch, c. 2nd century), one of the pseudepigrapha, describes the just rewards of sinners and the righteous in the afterlife. Among the sinners are those who instigated the Tower of Babel. In the account, Baruch is first taken (in a vision) to see the resting place of the souls of "those who built the tower of strife against God, and the Lord banished them." Next he is shown another place, and there, occupying the form of dogs,

Those who gave counsel to build the tower, for they whom thou seest drove forth multitudes of both men and women, to make bricks; among whom, a woman making bricks was not allowed to be released in the hour of child-birth, but brought forth while she was making bricks, and carried her child in her apron, and continued to make bricks. And the Lord appeared to them and confused their speech, when they had built the tower to the height of four hundred and sixty-three cubits. And they took a gimlet, and sought to pierce the heavens, saying, "Let us see (whether) the heaven is made of clay, or of brass, or of iron." When God saw this He did not permit them, but smote them with blindness and confusion of speech, and rendered them as thou seest.

— Greek Apocalypse of Baruch, 3:5–8

=== Midrash ===
Rabbinic literature offers many different accounts of other causes for building the Tower of Babel, and of the intentions of its builders. According to one midrash the builders of the Tower, called "the generation of secession" in the Jewish sources, said: "God has no right to choose the upper world for Himself, and to leave the lower world to us; therefore we will build us a tower, with an idol on the top holding a sword, so that it may appear as if it intended to war with God".

The building of the Tower was meant to bid defiance not only to God, but also to Abraham, who exhorted the builders to reverence. The passage mentions that the builders spoke sharp words against God, saying that once every 1,656 years, heaven tottered so that the water poured down upon the earth, therefore they would support it by columns that there might not be another deluge.

Some among that generation even wanted to war against God in heaven (Talmud Sanhedrin 109a). They were encouraged in this undertaking by the notion that arrows that they shot into the sky fell back dripping with blood, so that the people really believed that they could wage war against the inhabitants of the heavens. According to Josephus and Midrash Pirke R. El. xxiv., it was mainly Nimrod who persuaded his contemporaries to build the tower, while other rabbinical sources assert, on the contrary, that Nimrod separated from the builders.

According to another midrashic account, one third of the tower builders were punished by being transformed into semi-demonic creatures and banished into three parallel dimensions, inhabited now by their descendants.

=== Islamic tradition ===
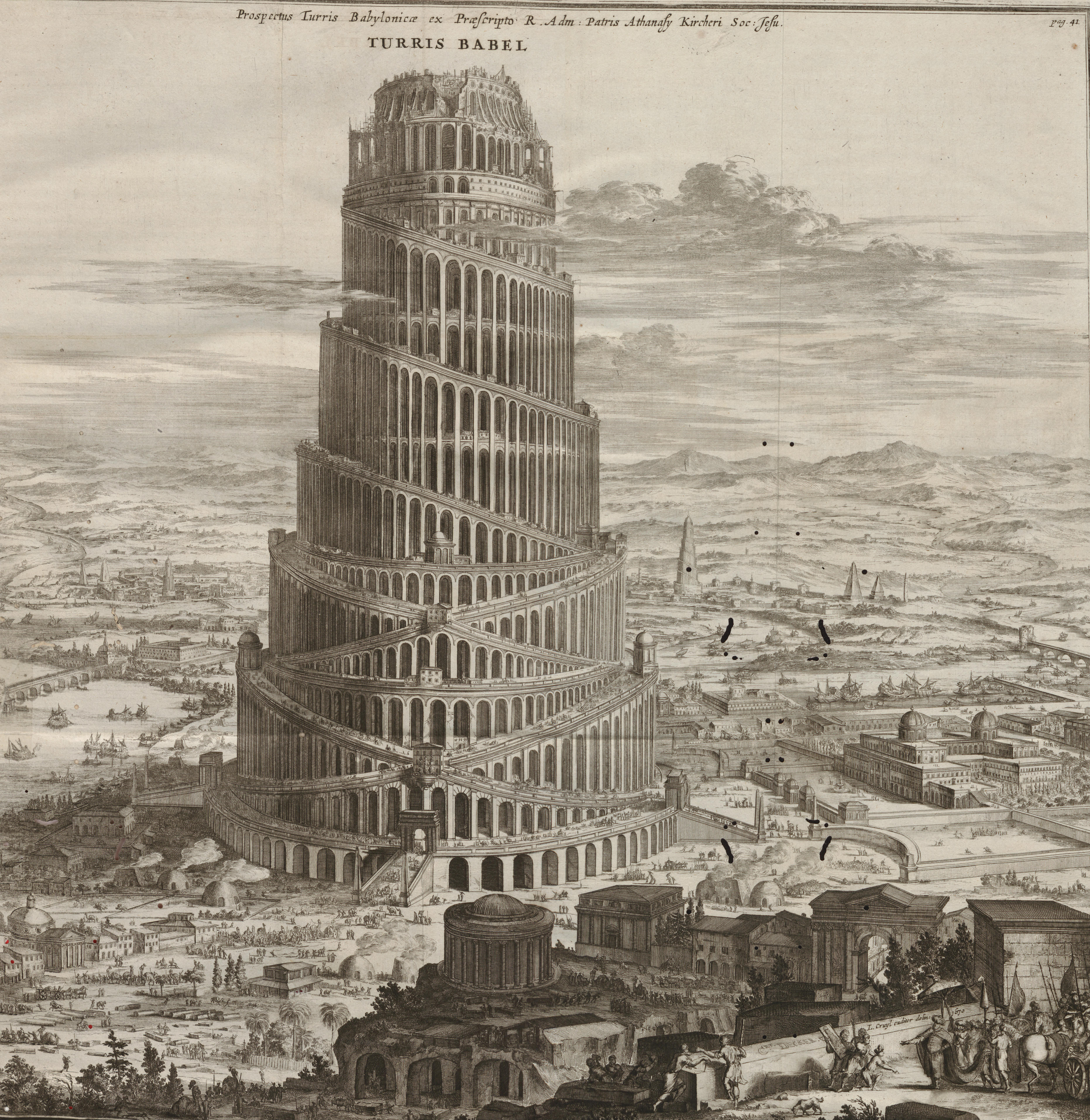
Turris Babel from Athanasius Kircher

The Quran has no story about the Tower of Babel. However, similar stories appear in the Qisas al-Anbiya. Although variations similar to the biblical narrative of the Tower of Babel exist within Islamic tradition, the central theme of God separating humankind on the basis of language is alien to Islam according to the author Yahiya Emerick. In Islamic belief, he argues, God created nations to know each other and not to be separated.

In the History of the Prophets and Kings by the 9th-century Muslim theologian al-Tabari, a fuller version is given: Nimrod has the tower built in Babil, God destroys it, and the language of mankind, formerly Syriac, is then confused into 72 languages. A tale about Babel appears more fully in the writings of Yaqut (i, 448 f.) and the Lisān al-ʿArab (xiii. 72), but without the tower: mankind were swept together by winds into the plain that was afterward called "Babil", where they were assigned their separate languages by God, and were then scattered again in the same way. Another Muslim historian of the 13th century, Abu al-Fida relates the same story, adding that the patriarch Eber (an ancestor of Abraham) was allowed to keep the original tongue, Hebrew in this case, because he would not partake in the building.

=== Book of Mormon ===
In the Book of Mormon, a man named Jared and his family ask God that their language not be confounded at the time of the "great tower". Because of their prayers, God preserves their language and leads them to the Valley of Nimrod. From there, they travel across the sea to the Americas.

Despite no mention of the Tower of Babel in the original text of the Book of Mormon, some leaders in the Church of Jesus Christ of Latter-day Saints (LDS Church) assert that the "great tower" was indeed the Tower of Babel – as in the 1981 introduction to the Book of Mormon – despite the chronology of the Book of Ether aligning more closely with the 21st century BC Sumerian tower temple myth of Enmerkar and the Lord of Aratta to the goddess Innana. Church apologists have also supported this connection and argue the reality of the Tower of Babel: "Although there are many in our day who consider the accounts of the Flood and tower of Babel to be fiction, Latter-day Saints affirm their reality." In either case, the church firmly believes in the factual nature of at least one "great tower" built in the region of ancient Sumer/Assyria/Babylonia.

=== Gnosticism ===
In Gnostic tradition recorded in the Paraphrase of Shem, a tower, interpreted as the Tower of Babel, is brought by demons along with the great flood:

And he caused the flood, and he destroyed your (Shem's) race, to take the light and to take away from faith. But I proclaimed quickly by the mouth of the demon that a tower come up to be up to the particle of light, which was left in the demons and their race – which was water – that the demon might be protected from the turbulent chaos. And the womb planned these things according to my will, that she might pour forth completely. A tower came to be through the demons. The darkness was disturbed by his loss. He loosened the muscles of the womb. And the demon who was going to enter the tower was protected so that the races might continue to acquire coherence through him.

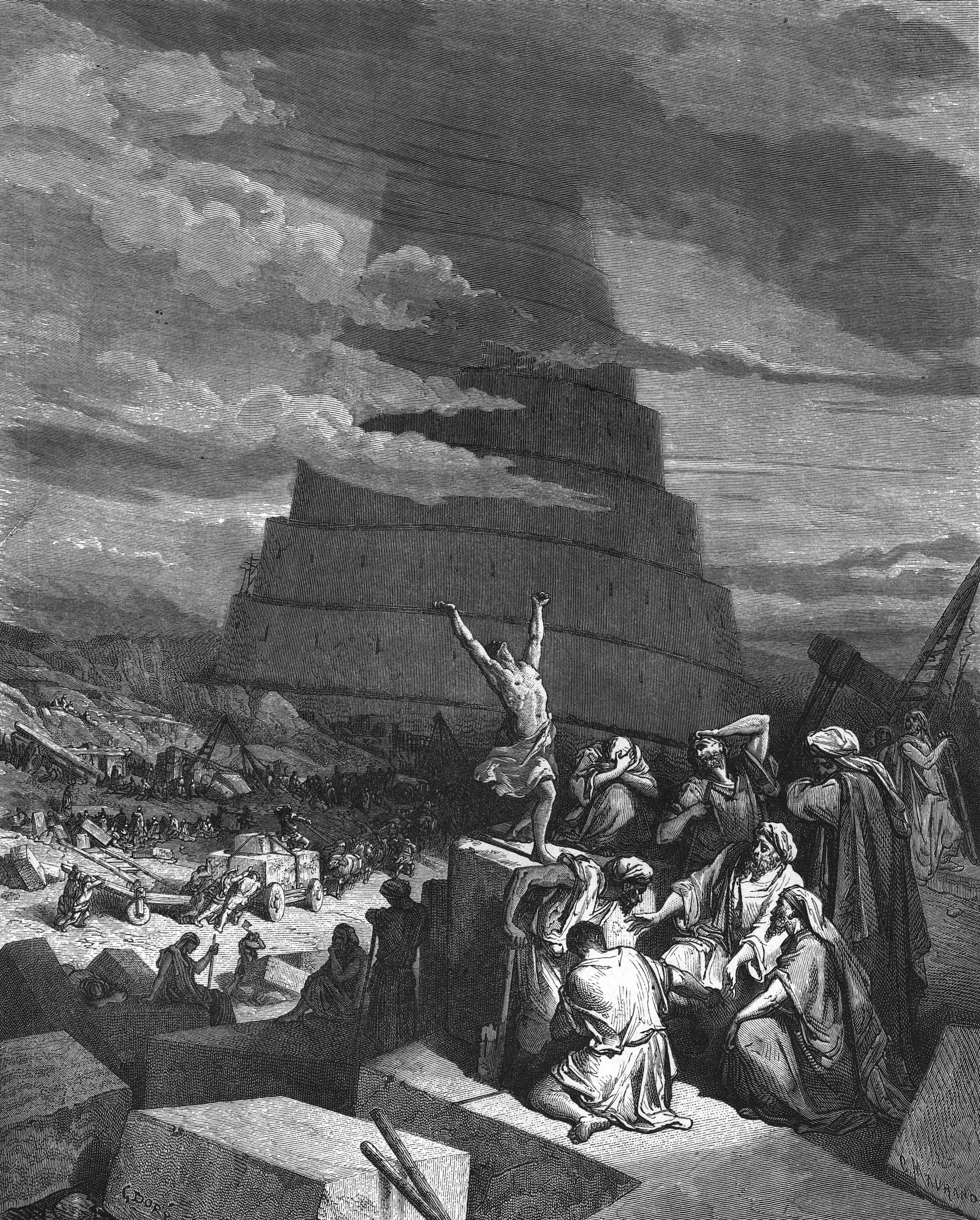
The Confusion of Tongues by Gustave Doré, an engraving depicting the Tower of Babel

== Linguistics ==
For a long time, historical linguistics wrestled with the idea of a single original language. In the Middle Ages and down to the 17th century, attempts were made to identify a living descendant of the Adamic language.

=== Multiplication of languages ===
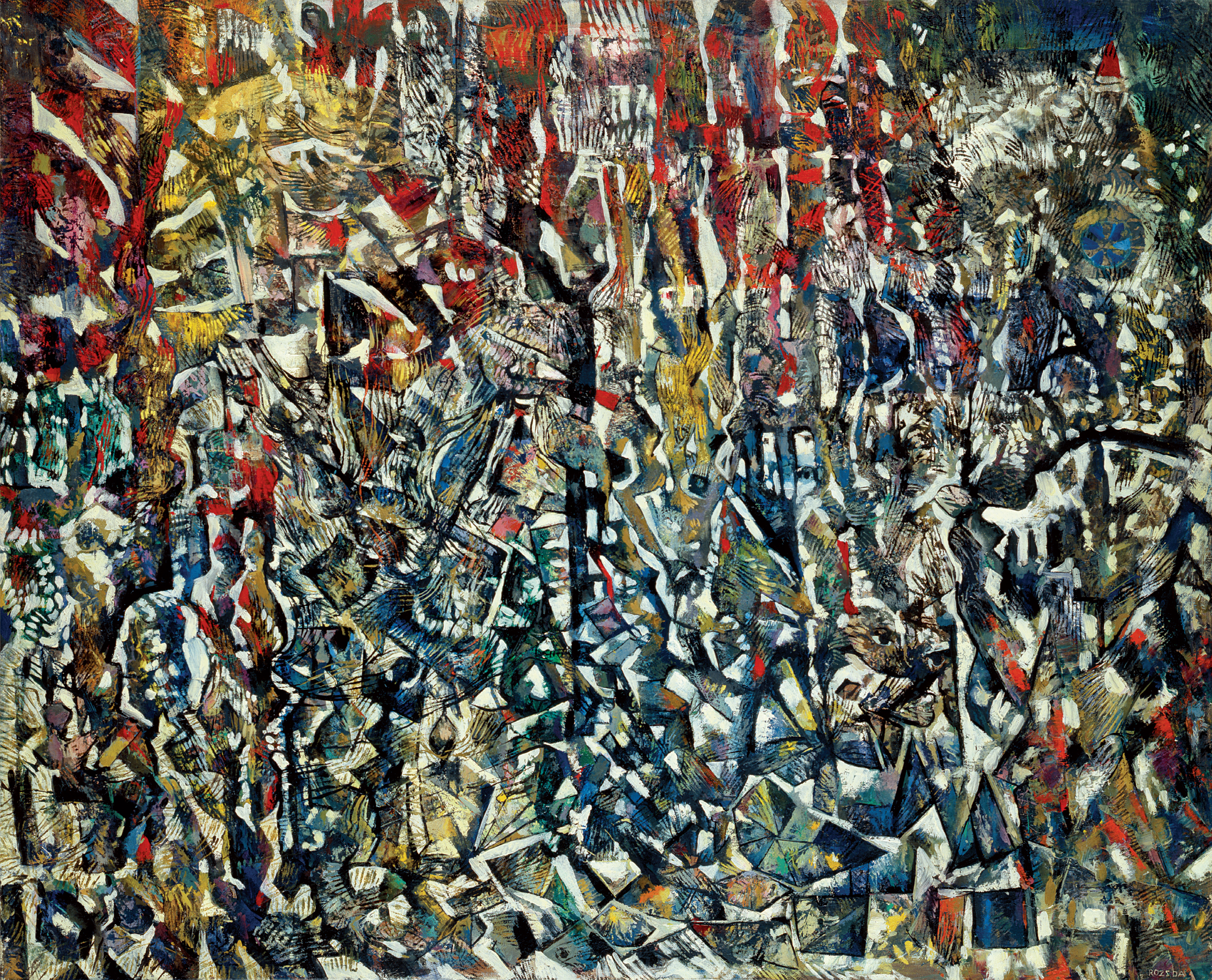
Tower of Babel by Endre Rozsda (1958)

The literal belief that the world's linguistic variety originated with the tower of Babel is pseudolinguistics and is contrary to the known facts about the origin and history of languages.

In the biblical introduction of the Tower of Babel account, in Genesis 11:1, it is said that everyone on Earth spoke the same language, but this is inconsistent with the biblical description of the post-Noahic world described in Genesis 10:5, where it is said that the descendants of Shem, Ham, and Japheth gave rise to different nations, each with their own language. Thomas L. Thompson indicates that the table of nations in Genesis 10 and the Tower of Babel story in Genesis 11, are two parallel stories.

There have also been a number of traditions around the world that describe a divine confusion of the one original language into several, albeit without any tower. Aside from the Ancient Greek myth that Hermes confused the languages, causing Zeus to give his throne to Phoroneus, Frazer specifically mentions such accounts among the Wasania of Kenya, the Kacha Naga people of Assam, the inhabitants of Encounter Bay in Australia, the Maidu of California, the Tlingit of Alaska, and the K'iche' Maya of Guatemala.

The Estonian myth of "the Cooking of Languages" has also been compared.

During the Middle Ages, the Hebrew language was widely considered the language used by God to address Adam in Paradise, and by Adam as lawgiver (the Adamic language) by various Jewish, Christian, and Muslim scholastics.

Dante Alighieri addresses the topic in his De vulgari eloquentia (1302–1305). He argues that the Adamic language is of divine origin and therefore unchangeable.

In his Divine Comedy (c. 1308–1320), however, Dante changes his view to another that treats the Adamic language as the product of Adam. This had the consequence that it could no longer be regarded as immutable, and hence Hebrew could not be regarded as identical with the language of Paradise. Dante concludes (Paradiso XXVI) that Hebrew is a derivative of the language of Adam. In particular, the chief Hebrew name for God in scholastic tradition, El, must be derived of a different Adamic name for God, which Dante gives as I.

Before the acceptance of the Indo-European language family, these languages were considered to be "Japhetite" by some authors (e.g., Rasmus Rask in 1815; see Indo-European studies). Beginning in Renaissance Europe, priority over Hebrew was claimed for the alleged Japhetic languages, which were supposedly never corrupted because their speakers had not participated in the construction of the Tower of Babel. Among the candidates for a living descendant of the Adamic language were: Gaelic (see Auraicept na n-Éces); Tuscan (Giovanni Battista Gelli, 1542, Pier Francesco Giambullari, 1564); Dutch (Goropius Becanus, 1569, Abraham Mylius, 1612); Swedish (Olaus Rudbeck, 1675); German (Georg Philipp Harsdörffer, 1641, Schottel, 1641). The Swedish physician Andreas Kempe wrote a satirical tract in 1688, where he made fun of the contest between the European nationalists to claim their native tongue as the Adamic language. Caricaturing the attempts by the Swede Olaus Rudbeck to pronounce Swedish the original language of mankind, Kempe wrote a scathing parody where Adam spoke Danish, God spoke Swedish, and the serpent French.

The primacy of Hebrew was still defended by some authors until the emergence of modern linguistics in the second half of the 18th century, e.g. by Pierre Besnier (1648–1705) in A philosophicall essay for the reunion of the languages, or, the art of knowing all by the mastery of one (1675) and by Gottfried Hensel (1687–1767) in his Synopsis Universae Philologiae (1741).

=== Enumeration of scattered languages ===
There are several mediaeval historiographic accounts that attempt to make an enumeration of the languages scattered at the Tower of Babel. Because a count of all the descendants of Noah listed by name in chapter 10 of Genesis (LXX) provides 15 names for Japheth's descendants, 30 for Ham's, and 27 for Shem's, these figures became established as the 72 languages resulting from the confusion at Babel—although the exact listing of these languages changed over time. (The LXX Bible has two additional names, Elisa and Cainan, not found in the Masoretic text of this chapter, so early rabbinic traditions, such as the Mishna, speak instead of "70 languages".) Some of the earliest sources for 72 (sometimes 73) languages are the 2nd-century Christian writers Clement of Alexandria (Stromata I, 21) and Hippolytus of Rome (On the Psalms 9); it is repeated in the Syriac book Cave of Treasures (c. 350 CE), Epiphanius of Salamis' Panarion (c. 375) and St. Augustine's The City of God 16.6 (c. 410). The chronicles attributed to Hippolytus (c. 234) contain one of the first attempts to list each of the 72 peoples who were believed to have spoken these languages.

Isidore of Seville in his Etymologiae (c. 600) mentions the number of 72; however, his list of names from the Bible drops the sons of Joktan and substitutes the sons of Abraham and Lot, resulting in only about 56 names total; he then appends a list of some of the nations known in his own day, such as the Longobards and the Franks. This listing was to prove quite influential on later accounts that made the Lombards and Franks themselves into descendants of eponymous grandsons of Japheth, e.g. the Historia Brittonum (c. 833), The Meadows of Gold by al Masudi (c. 947) and Book of Roads and Kingdoms by al-Bakri (1068), the 11th-century Lebor Gabála Érenn, and the midrashic compilations Yosippon (c. 950), Chronicles of Jerahmeel, and Sefer haYashar.

Other sources that mention 72 (or 70) languages scattered from Babel are the Old Irish poem Cu cen mathair by Luccreth moccu Chiara (c. 600); the Irish monastic work Auraicept na n-Éces; History of the Prophets and Kings by the Persian historian Muhammad ibn Jarir al-Tabari (c. 915); the Anglo-Saxon dialogue Solomon and Saturn; the Russian Primary Chronicle (c. 1113); the Jewish Kabbalistic work Bahir (1174); the Prose Edda of Snorri Sturluson (c. 1200); the Syriac Book of the Bee (c. 1221); the Gesta Hunnorum et Hungarorum (c. 1284; mentions 22 for Shem, 31 for Ham and 17 for Japheth for a total of 70); Villani's 1300 account; and the rabbinic Midrash ha-Gadol (14th century). Villani adds that it "was begun 700 years after the Flood, and there were 2,354 years from the beginning of the world to the confusion of the Tower of Babel. And we find that they were 107 years working at it; and men lived long in those times". According to the Gesta Hunnorum et Hungarorum, however, the project was begun only 200 years following the Deluge.

The tradition of 72 languages persisted into later times. Both José de Acosta in his 1576 treatise De procuranda indorum salute, and António Vieira a century later in his Sermão da Epifania, expressed amazement at how much this 'number of tongues' could be surpassed, there being hundreds of mutually unintelligible languages indigenous only to Peru and Brazil.

== Comparable myths ==
=== Greco-Roman parallel ===
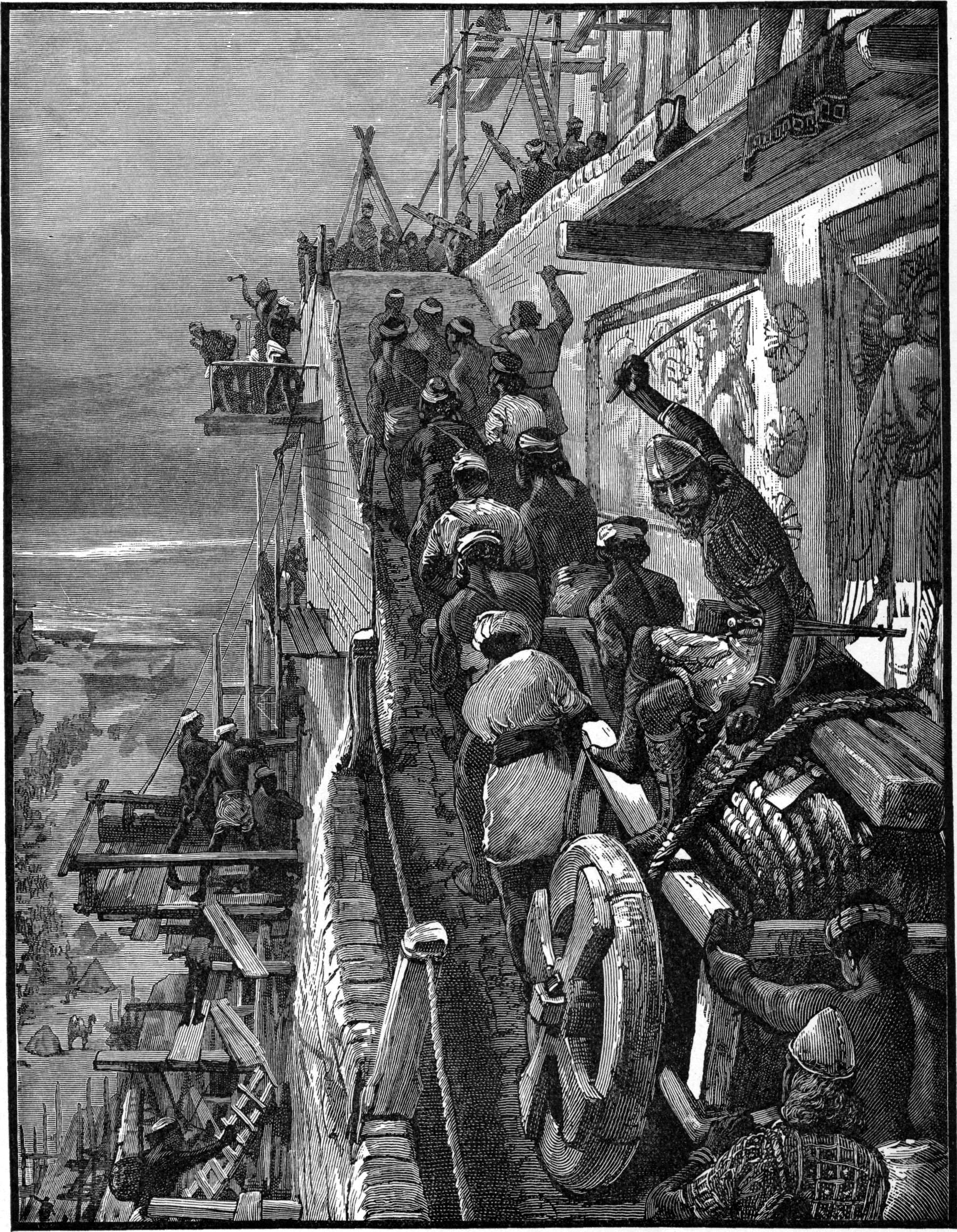
Building of Babel

In Greek mythology, much of which was adopted by the Romans, there is a myth referred to as the Gigantomachy, the battle fought between the Giants and the Olympian gods for supremacy of the cosmos. In Ovid's telling of the myth, the Giants attempt to reach the gods in heaven by stacking mountains, but are repelled by Jupiter's thunderbolts. A.S. Kline translates Ovid's Metamorphoses 1.151–155 as:

Rendering the heights of heaven no safer than the earth, they say the giants attempted to take the Celestial kingdom, piling mountains up to the distant stars. Then the all-powerful father of the gods hurled his bolt of lightning, fractured Olympus and threw Mount Pelion down from Ossa below.

=== Mexico ===
Various traditions similar to that of the tower of Babel are found in Latin America. James Frazer connected the Great Pyramid of Cholula to the Tower of Babel. The Dominican friar Diego Durán (1537–1588) reported hearing an account about the pyramid from a hundred-year-old priest at Cholula, shortly after the conquest of the Aztec Empire. He wrote that he was told when the light of the Sun first appeared upon the land, giants appeared and set off in search of the Sun. Not finding it, they built a tower to reach the sky. An angered God of the Heavens called upon the inhabitants of the sky, who destroyed the tower and scattered its inhabitants. The story was not related to either a flood or the confusion of languages, although Frazer connects its construction and the scattering of the giants with the Tower of Babel.

Another story, attributed by the native historian Fernando de Alva Cortés Ixtlilxóchitl (c. 1565–1648) to the ancient Toltecs, states that after men had multiplied following a great deluge, they erected a tall zacuali or tower, to preserve themselves in the event of a second deluge. However, their languages were confounded and they went to separate parts of the Earth.

=== Arizona ===
Still another story, attributed to the Tohono O'odham people, holds that Montezuma escaped a great flood, then became wicked and attempted to build a house reaching to heaven, but the Great Spirit destroyed it with thunderbolts.

=== Nepal ===
Traces of a somewhat similar story have also been reported among the Tharu of Nepal and northern India.

=== Botswana ===
According to David Livingstone, the people he met living near Lake Ngami in 1849 had such a tradition, but with the builders' heads getting "cracked by the fall of the scaffolding".

=== Other traditions ===
In his 1918 book, Folklore in the Old Testament, Scottish social anthropologist Sir James George Frazer documented similarities between Old Testament stories, such as the Flood, and indigenous legends around the world. He identified Livingston's account with a tale found in Lozi mythology, wherein the wicked men build a tower of masts to pursue the Creator-God, Nyambe, who has fled to Heaven on a spider-web, but the men perish when the masts collapse. He further relates similar tales of the Ashanti that substitute a pile of porridge pestles for the masts. Frazer moreover cites such legends found among the Kongo people, as well as in Tanzania, where the men stack poles or trees in a failed attempt to reach the Moon. He further cited the Karbi and Kuki people of Assam as having a similar story. The traditions of the Karen people of Myanmar, which Frazer considered to show clear 'Abrahamic' influence, also relate that their ancestors migrated there following the abandonment of a great pagoda in the land of the Karenni 30 generations from Adam, when the languages were confused and the Karen separated from the Karenni. He notes yet another version current in the Admiralty Islands, where mankind's languages are confused following a failed attempt to build houses reaching to heaven.

== In popular culture ==
- The "Babel fish" is a fictional fish in Douglas Adams' novel The Hitchhiker's Guide to the Galaxy, which can be placed in someone's ear for them to instantly understand anything said to them in any form of language. Yahoo used this as a base for their "Yahoo! Babel Fish" online translation service.
- Pieter Brueghel's influential portrayal is based on the Colosseum in Rome, while later conical depictions of the tower (as depicted in Doré's illustration) resemble much later Muslim towers observed by 19th-century explorers in the area, notably the Minaret of Samarra. M.C. Escher depicts a more stylized geometrical structure in his woodcut representing the story.
- The composer Anton Rubinstein wrote an opera based on the story Der Thurm zu Babel.
- American choreographer Adam Darius staged a multilingual theatrical interpretation of The Tower of Babel in 1993 at the ICA in London.
- Fritz Lang's 1927 film Metropolis, in a flashback, plays upon themes of lack of communication between the designers of the tower and the workers who are constructing it. The short scene states how the words used to glorify the tower's construction by its designers took on totally different, oppressive meanings to the workers. This led to its destruction as they rose up against the designers because of the insufferable working conditions. The appearance of the tower was modeled after Brueghel's 1563 painting.
- The Tower's story is replicated in the 1966 epic film The Bible: In the Beginning....
- The political philosopher Michael Oakeshott surveyed historic variations of the Tower of Babel in different cultures and produced a modern retelling of his own in his 1983 book, On History. In his retelling, Oakeshott expresses disdain for human willingness to sacrifice individuality, culture, and quality of life for grand collective projects. He attributes this behavior to fascination with novelty, persistent dissatisfaction, greed, and lack of self-reflection.
- A. S. Byatt's novel Babel Tower (1996) is about the question "whether language can be shared, or, if that turns out to be illusory, how individuals, in talking to each other, fail to understand each other".
- Science fiction writer Ted Chiang wrote a story called "Tower of Babylon" that imagined a miner's climbing the tower all the way to the top where he meets the vault of heaven.
- This biblical episode is dramatized in the Indian television series Bible Ki Kahaniyan, which aired on DD National from 1992.
- Chris Huelsbeck has created an orchestral piece titled "Tower of Babel" which appears in Turrican II: The Final Fight.
- The Tower of Babel appears in the 47th episode of the anime series Arabian Nights: Sinbad's Adventures.
- In the 1990 Japanese television anime Nadia: The Secret of Blue Water, the Tower of Babel is used by the Atlanteans as an interstellar communication device. Later in the series, the Neo Atlanteans rebuild the Tower of Babel and use its communication beam as a weapon of mass destruction. Both the original and the rebuilt tower resembles the painting Tower of Babel by artist Pieter Bruegel the Elder.
- Argentinian novelist Jorge Luis Borges wrote a story called "The Library of Babel".
- 2017 comic book La tour de Bab-El-Oued (The tower of Bab-El-Oued) from Sfar's The Rabbi's Cat series refers to the Tower of Babel in a context of intercultural conflict and cooperation (Jews and Muslims during the French colonization in Algeria).
- In the video game Doshin the Giant, the final monument the island inhabitants can create is called the Tower of Babel, which begins to sink the island. The titular Doshin the Giant then sacrifices himself to save the island.
- The 2023 video game Chants of Sennaar is largely inspired by the Tower of Babel.
- The 2006 film Babel interweaves the unfortunate circumstances of a Moroccan, an American, a Mexican, and a Japanese family through a series of miscommunications.
- The Tower of Babel is mentioned in the 2016 film X-Men: Apocalypse by the character En Sabah Nur (Apocalypse), when he illustrates the futility of humans opposing him.
- "Babel" or similar versions have been used multiple times to name a service or tool that relates to languages in general, e.g., the very popular LaTeX package "babel", which adds support for other languages other than English. Another example is the online language learning platform "Babbel.com".

== See also ==
- Babylonian astronomy
- Borsippa
- Enuma Anu Enlil
- Eridu
- Etana
- Evolutionary linguistics
- Generations of Noah
- List of tallest structures
- Minar (Firuzabad)
- Origin of speech
