= Coriantumr (last Jaredite king) =

Last king and survivor of the Jaredites

In the book of Ether found in the Book of Mormon, King Coriantumr (/ˌkɒriˈæntəmər/) was the last Jaredite along with the prophet Ether. He and his family lived wickedly, rejecting Ether's invitation to change their ways. Over the course of his reign, many people try to take the kingdom from Coriantumr. In an effort to preserve his kingship, he wages war with the men who desire his sovereign position, including Shiz. The two men participate in a great last battle with their armies at the Hill Ramah, where Coriantumr decapitates his enemy. With the armies annihilated and only two Jaredites left alive, himself included, Coriantumr wanders through the land and is discovered by the people of Zarahemla, who are a remnant of the Mulekites. He lives the rest of his life in Zarahemla, dying shortly thereafter.

== Narrative ==
Coriantumr is one of the last Jaredites, as well as their last king. During his reign, Ether, a prophet acting under the direction of God, prophesies to the people; nobody believes and eventually he is cast out, the destruction prophecy of Coriantumr's family is given,^{:309} and Ether remains in a cave to record the events.

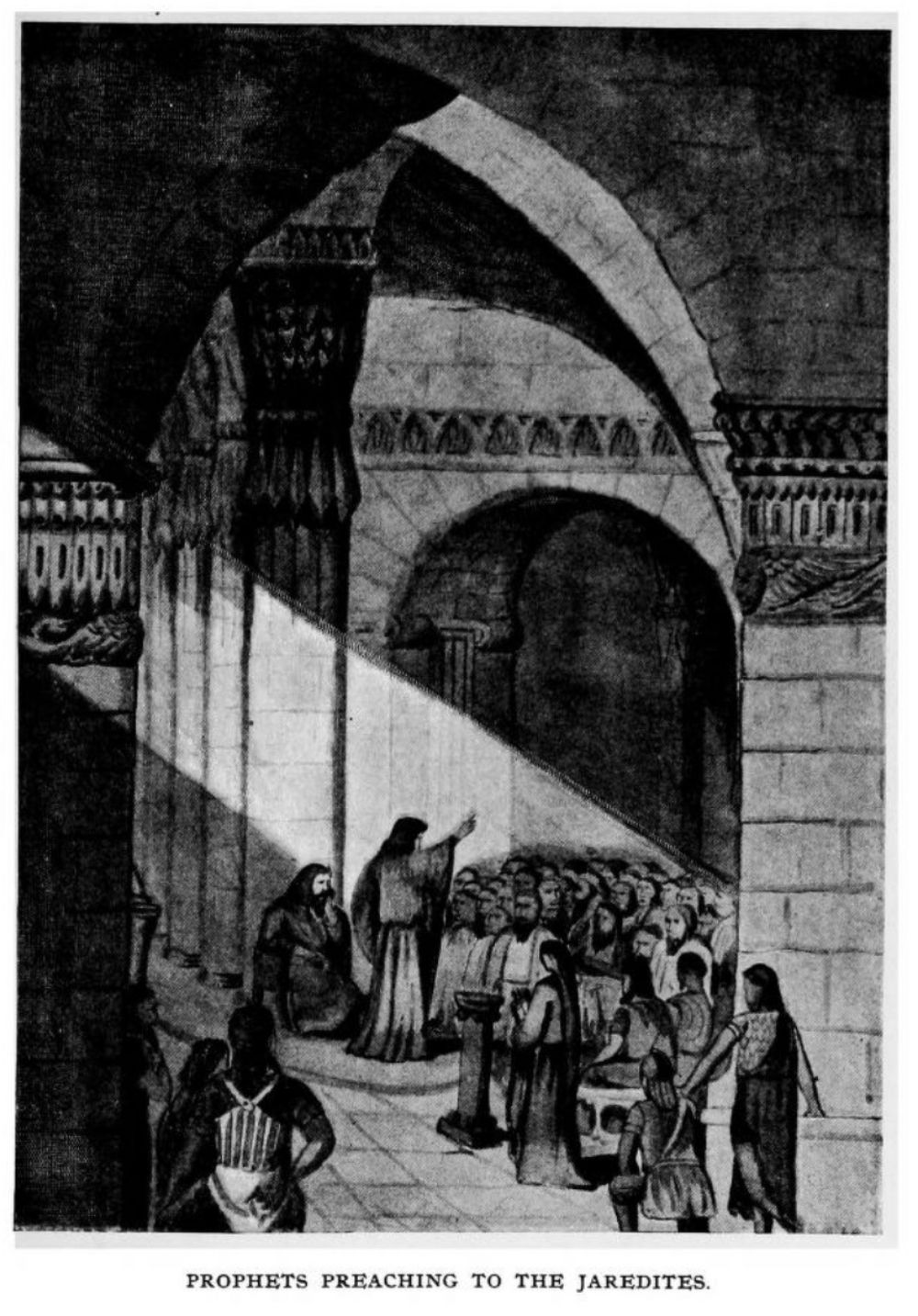
"Prophets Preaching to the Jaredites" by John Held, Sr.

Some time later, a huge war breaks out among the people, many of whom secretly conspire to kill Coriantumr. However, Coriantumr, knowing much about battle, wages war with them. The war takes a bloody turn and the king is wounded. Ether tells him that the Lord will spare him and his household if they repent; otherwise, they will be destroyed and another people will inherit the land; further, Coriantumr will be the last survivor to see them do so.

Coriantumr refuses to repent and tries killing Ether, who escapes. Some time after, Shared arrives, defeating the king and taking him captive. However, his sons rescue him and re-obtain the kingdom, though the people still rebel against God and rob each other. Afterward, Coriantumr and Shared conjure armies, fighting through the Valley of Gilgal, to the Plains of Heshlon, and back to the Valley of Gilgal, where Shared is slain. During the battle Shared wounds Coriantumr in the thigh; the wound prevents him from going to battle for two years, leaving the people to war unrestrained.

Eventually Coriantumr fights with Gilead, Shared's brother. Gilead and his army are beaten and chased to the wilderness of Akish, with thousands of people getting murdered along the way. Gilead rushes to the Land of Moron in the night while Coriantumr's army is drunk, killing several people. He sits on Coriantumr's throne for two years while Coriantumr recruits more warriors. After a while Gilead's high priest murders him on his own throne. The high priest is then murdered by a man named Lib, who is involved in secret combinations. Coriantumr returns with his army to battle with Lib's troops, where Lib wounds Coriantumr's arm. Lib flees to the coast and they fight again. Lib flees to the wilderness of Akish then to the plains of Agosh. Coriantumr pursues with all his people and kills Lib; however, Lib's brother, Shiz, takes up the cause, setting fire to cities and killing men, women, and children. The stench of the dead bodies is so strong it disturbs the people, but Shiz continues his ravaging, swearing to avenge his brother.

Shiz pursues Coriantumr to the coast where they battle for three days. Coriantumr's army kills so many of Shiz's warriors that the people run away, though some join Coriantumr's army as an act of self-preservation.

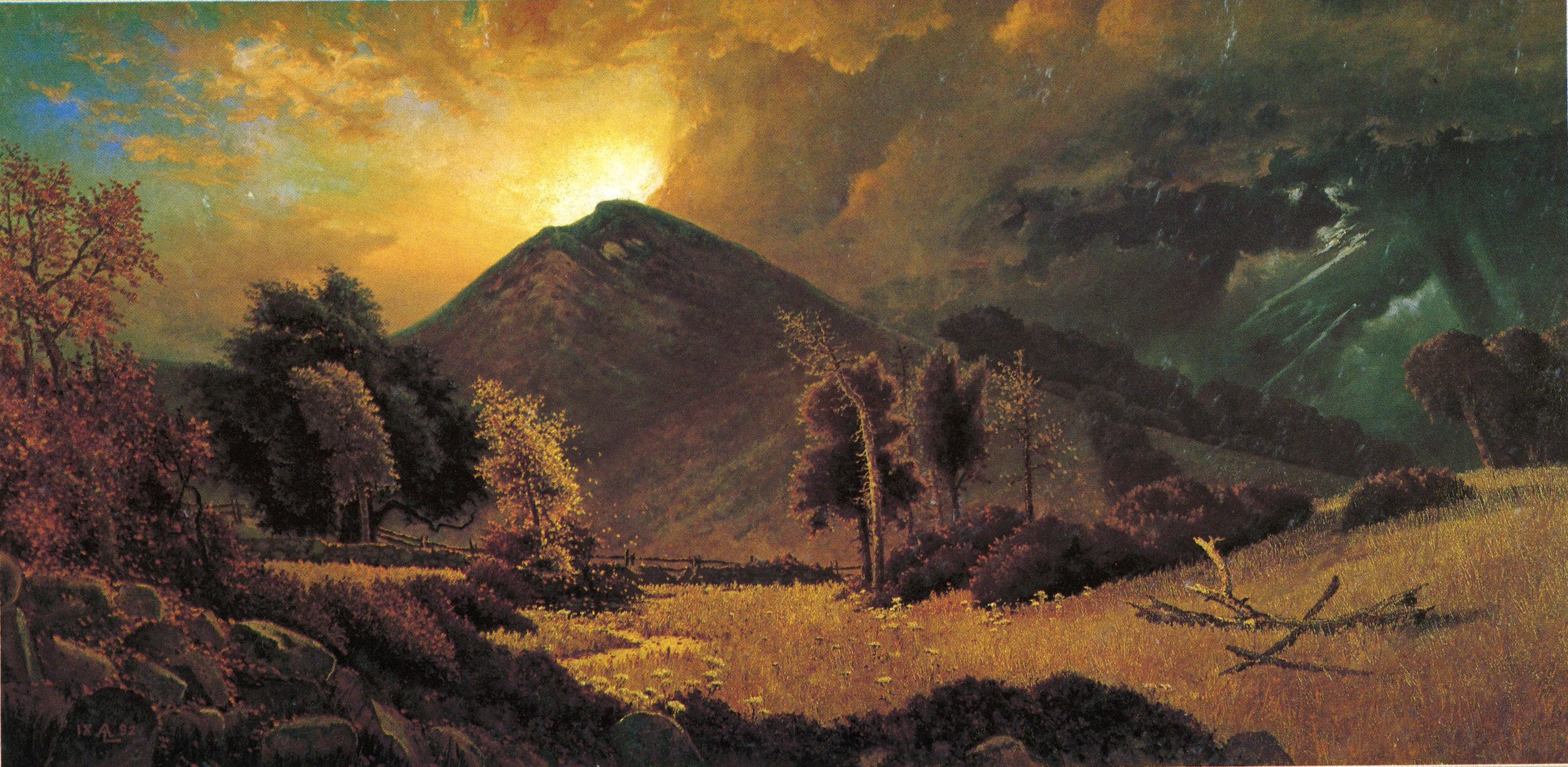
"Hill Cumorah" by Alfred Lambourne

After many battles and almost two million deaths, Coriantumr longs to end the fighting. He begins to repent and sends an epistle to Shiz asking him to stop the war for the people's sake; he also offers the kingdom to Shiz. Shiz agrees on the condition that Coriantumr turn himself over to be killed. Coriantumr refuses and the armies gather on the Hill Ramah for the final battle. Over time the numbers dwindle until only Ether, Shiz, and Coriantumr are left. The two leaders fight until Shiz faints due to blood loss, after which Coriantumr cuts his head off. The war over and a one or two thousand-year-old kingdom annihilated, Coriantumr wanders to eventually be found by the Mulekites. He shares his story and lives with them nine months until his death.

== Literary interpretation ==
Coriantumr's arc follows the "Martyred Hero" in a tragic predicament pattern that folklorist Bruce Rosenberg identified in the biblical king Saul, bearing a strong enough resemblance as to make Coriantumr Saul's doppelgänger.

BYU English professor Clinton F. Larson wrote a poetic drama about king Coriantumr, published in 1961 with a companion piece as Coriantumr and Moroni. In Coriantumr and Moroni, king Coriantumr's role includes reciting what literary scholar Edward Whitley calls an "expansive, scenery-chewing soliloqu[y]" as he watches Jaredite civilization collapse.

Author James Goldberg writes about Coriantumr in "The Book of Mormon Was Written for Our Day", a poem from his anthology A Book of Lamentations.^{:178–181} In the words of reviewer Edward Whitley, Goldberg's poem regards Coriantumr as "the representative figure for generational sin", as the downfall of Coriantumr and the Jaredites he reigns over is the result of his and the Jaredites' "collective values".^{:180} The reception of Coriantumr in "The Book of Mormon Was Written for Our Day" is intertextual with T. S. Eliot's poem "The Hollow Men", Whitley explains, as both use threefold refrains issuing dire warnings to readers: in the former, Coriantumr warns that humans are "so very capable / of choosing death / and choosing it / and choosing it / and choosing it"; the latter warns that "this is the way the world ends / this is the way the world ends / this is the way the world ends".^{:181}

Charles W. Dunn depicts Coriantumr's last battle—which ended Jaredite society—in his book The Master's Other Sheep: An Epic of America and Other Poems. In an analysis of Dunn's poem, Whitley notes that Dunn significantly portrays "Ramah", the site of Coriantumr's last battle, as being the same hill as the Hill Cumorah, where the Nephites are also destroyed; a poem in the LDS Church's Ensign magazine similarly conflates the hills.

== See also ==
- Coriantumr (Son of Omer)
- Coriantumr (Nephite Dissenter)

== Works cited ==
- Largey, Dennis L.; Arnold, Marilyn; Ball, Terry; Dahl, Larry E.; Parry, Donald; Seely, David R.; Williams, Clyde J., eds. (2003). Book of Mormon Reference Companion. Deseret Book Company. ISBN 1-57345-231-9. Wikidata Q123364479.
