= Jared (founder of Jaredites) =

Primary ancestor of the Jaredites in the Book of Mormon

In the Book of Ether in the Book of Mormon, Jared was the primary ancestor of the Jaredites. He is not to be confused with another Jared, a later Jaredite king who dethroned his father, Omer.

== Biblical Jared ==
The Book of Mormon Jared has the same name as the antediluvian biblical patriarch Jared (Hebrew: יֶרֶד Yéreḏ, in pausa יָרֶד Yā́reḏ, "to descend"),

== Migration ==
According to the narrative Jared, along with family and friends came to the "promised land" (the Americas) shortly after the great Tower of Babel. When the language of the people was confounded, Jared asked his brother to ask God not to confound their own language, that of their friends, and that of their immediate families. This means that they arrived much earlier than Lehi and Nephi and their families did. The Brother of Jared (not named in the text, but later referred to as "Mahonri Moriancumer" by Joseph Smith) is also a significant character.

Jared's group, the ancestors of the Jaredites, were guided through the wilderness by God, and then fled across the ocean on unusual barges and established an ancient civilization in the Americas. They also brought with them animals and food. The recorded length of the miraculous trip was 344 days. The Book of Ether's mention of a "narrow neck of land" has led some to posit various locations for their point of arrival. Some of these include "necks of land" in Central America or modern-day Mexico. Others favor a location which spanned from the Midwest to the Eastern United States such as New York. However, neither of these are certain, and are not supported by mainstream archeology.

Mormon apologists link this story to various traditions similar to that of the tower of Babel said to be found in Central America. Some writers connected the Great Pyramid of Cholula to the Tower of Babel. The Dominican friar Diego Durán (1537–1588) reported hearing an account about the pyramid from a hundred-year-old priest at Cholula, shortly after the conquest of Mexico. He wrote that he was told when the light of the sun first appeared upon the land, giants appeared and set off in search of the sun. Not finding it, they built a tower to reach the sky. An angered Lord of the Heavens called upon the inhabitants of the sky, who destroyed the tower and scattered its inhabitants. The story was not related to either a flood or the confusion of languages, although Frazer connects its construction and the scattering of the giants with the Tower of Babel. Another story, attributed by the native historian Fernando de Alva Cortés Ixtlilxóchitl (c. 1565–1648) to the ancient Toltecs, states that after men had multiplied following a great deluge, they erected a tall zacuali or tower, to preserve themselves in the event of a second deluge. However, their languages were confounded and they went to separate parts of the earth.

== Question of succession ==
As death was approaching Jared and his brother, Mahonri Moriancumer, gathered together the people to ask them what they desired of them before they died. The people then requested that they anoint one of their sons as king. This was grievous to them, and the Mahonri Moriancumer remarked that "surely this thing leadeth into captivity." Despite Mahonri's misgivings, Jared pressed him to allow the establishment of a Jaredite kingship at which suggestion the brother of Jared yielded.

== Family ==
Mahonri Moriancumer	Jared	(unnamed)
	Jacom	Gilgah	Mahah	Orihah
