= Ahah =

In Latter Day Saint movement, a Jaredite king, the son of Seth

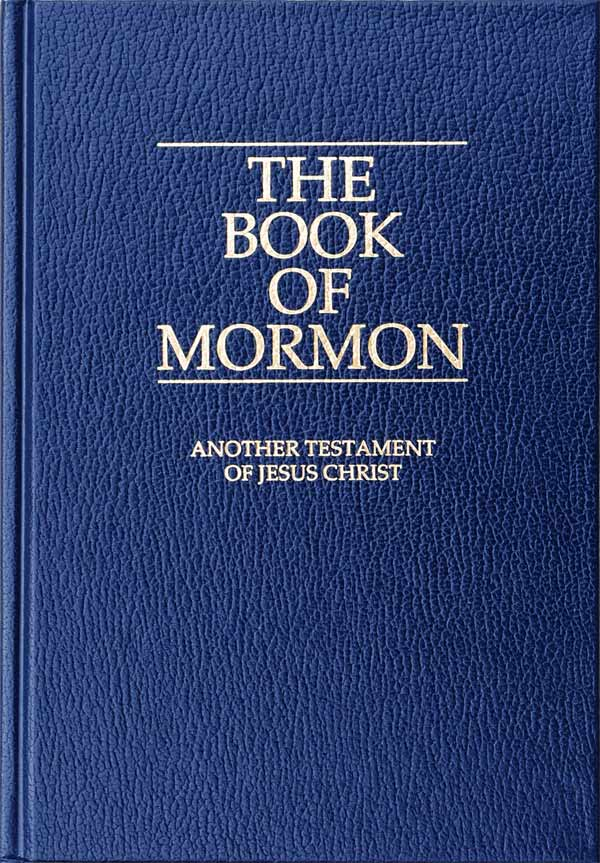
The Book of Mormon, one of the Mormon scriptures and simultaneously a source of information about Ahah

Ahah (deseret: 𐐁𐐐𐐂), in the beliefs of the Latter Day Saint movement (Mormons), was a Jaredite king, the son of Seth. Information about him is found in the Book of Ether, which is part of the Mormon sacred scriptures. His reign belongs to the later period of Jaredite history. It was said to be brief and marked by bloodshed and wickedness, continuing until Ahah's death. This ruler is also used by Mormon apologists. The name Ahah appears among the Māori who follow Mormonism.

== Pronunciation of the name ==
The pronunciation of this name has attracted some interest from Mormon researchers. It was included in the pronunciation guide added to each copy of the English version of The Book of Mormon since 1981. However, sources generally point to a significant difference between the preferred and common modern-day pronunciation and that from the early period of the colonization of Utah, particularly regarding many names and terms in The Book of Mormon. There is no such difference, however, in the case of Ahah. The original pronunciation, especially that used by Joseph Smith, has some significance in the study of proper names in The Book of Mormon, although, within the framework of Mormon theology, it is not a decisive factor. To determine the pronunciation used by Smith, the 1869 edition of The Book of Mormon in the Deseret alphabet is among the tools used.

However, there are accounts from people involved in the process called by the Latter Day Saints the translation of The Book of Mormon, which shed light on how Smith originally dealt with unfamiliar words. Hugh Nibley, citing accounts from Smith's scribes, stated that "he never pronounced such words, always settling for spelling them out". Strictly within the framework of Mormon theology, the original Jaredite pronunciation of such words is not investigated, nor is such inquiry made for Nephite words and names.

Within the framework of Mormon theology, there is an inherent problem with the pronunciation of names and terms belonging to this Mormon sacred text. This is because none of them were conveyed orally to Joseph Smith, except perhaps the name Moroni, who, after all, introduced himself to Smith in a vision. From a doctrinal perspective, the way in which the heroes of The Book of Mormon pronounced these words remains unknown to the first Mormon leader.

== Placement in The Book of Mormon ==
In a strictly theological sense, the account of Ahah is found in the section of material referred to as the plates of Mormon, which is the summary of the larger plates of Nephi, compiled by Mormon. It is placed in the portion of the text added to the plates of Mormon by Moroni. The content of the Book of Ether, which contains the preserved account of Ahah, is composed of a summary of the twenty-four golden plates of Ether, compiled by Moroni. In the official editions of The Book of Mormon, including the one in use since 1981, this figure is mentioned in verses nine and ten of the first chapter of the Book of Ether, as well as in verses ten and eleven of the eleventh chapter of the same book. The current system of division into chapters and verses in The Book of Mormon dates back to 1879. In its first edition, published in 1830, references to Ahah were part of the first and fourth chapters of the Book of Ether. It is estimated that the material concerning Ahah was written on 25 and 28 May 1829.

== Role in The Book of Mormon ==
Information about Ahah is found, as with other Jaredites, in the Book of Ether. His reign belongs to the later period of Jaredite history. According to the genealogy preserved in The Book of Mormon, he was the son of Seth and the father of Ether. His reign was short, marked by wickedness and significant bloodshed. He was to rule until his death. His son succeeded him. There has been speculation in commentaries regarding the nature of the succession after Ahah, suggesting at least that it may not have been peaceful.

== In Mormon theology and studies of The Book of Mormon ==
The existence of Ahah has not been confirmed by external sources. Linguists affiliated with The Church of Jesus Christ of Latter-day Saints have explored the etymology of this ruler's name, suggesting possible Semitic origins without definitive conclusions. Some have also hypothesized an Egyptian derivation of the name.

From a theological perspective, research on the etymology of Jaredite proper names remains speculative. Certain findings suggest that some names may have been translated into the language used by the Nephites. A clearer understanding of these names might be achieved by convincingly linking the Jaredites to one of the known ancient cultures. Ahah has also been analyzed in the context of Jaredite names reused among the Nephites, Lamanites, and Mulekites.

The suffix -hah or -ihah has been separately discussed, not only in relation to Jaredite but also to Nephite names. However, these debates remain inconclusive, highlighting the risks of uncritically deriving names from The Book of Mormon from Near Eastern sources.

John W. Welch, in his 2020 commentary on The Book of Mormon, observed that Ahah appears in the text twice, each time in a specific order. The first instance is in a genealogical sequence starting with Ether and ending with Jared. The second presents Ahah chronologically, with Jared as the progenitor of the Jaredites and Ether as the prophet, chronicler, and prince. Welch regarded the precision of this reversed placement as remarkable, interpreting it as evidence of divine inspiration enabling Joseph Smith to translate The Book of Mormon.

The name Ahah has also been included in comparative studies of naming practices in The Book of Mormon and J.R.R. Tolkien's works.

== In Mormon culture ==
Beyond theological and etymological speculation, Ahah has found a place in Mormon culture. It appears in entertainment and educational materials published by the church, such as the Friend magazine (May 1987 issue). Among Māori adherents to Mormonism, the name Ahah (in the form Ahaha) is also recorded.

== Bibliography ==
- Huchel, Frederick M. (2000). "The Deseret Alphabet as an Aid in Pronouncing Book of Mormon Names". Journal of Book of Mormon Studies. 9 (1). Brigham Young University. ISSN 2168-3158.
- Woodger, Mary Jane (2000). "How the Guide to English Pronunciation of Book of Mormon Names Came About". Journal of Book of Mormon Studies. 9 (1). Brigham Young University. ISSN 2168-3158.
- Mackay, Thomas W. (1993). "Mormon as Editor: A Study in Colophons, Headers, and Source Indicators Indicators". Journal of Book of Mormon Studies. 2 (2). Brigham Young University. ISSN 2168-3158.
- Hoskisson, Paul Y. (2009). "It Is OK Not to Have Every Answer: The Book of Mormon Onomastic Ending – (i)hah". Journal of the Book of Mormon and Other Restoration Scripture. 18 (1). Brigham Young University. ISSN 2167-7565.
- Welch, John W. (2020). John W. Welch Notes - Come Follow Me. Springville, Utah: Book of Mormon Central.
