= Ether (prophet) =

Jaredite prophet

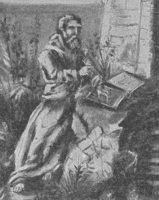
- Ether Finishing His Record, by William Morris (1888, cropped)

Personal life
- Parent: Coriantor (father)
- Era: Reign of Coriantumr
- Notable work: The 24 Jaredite plates

According to the Book of Mormon, Ether (/ˈiːθər/) was a Jaredite prophet, one of the last surviving Jaredites, and the primary author of the Book of Ether.

== Narration ==
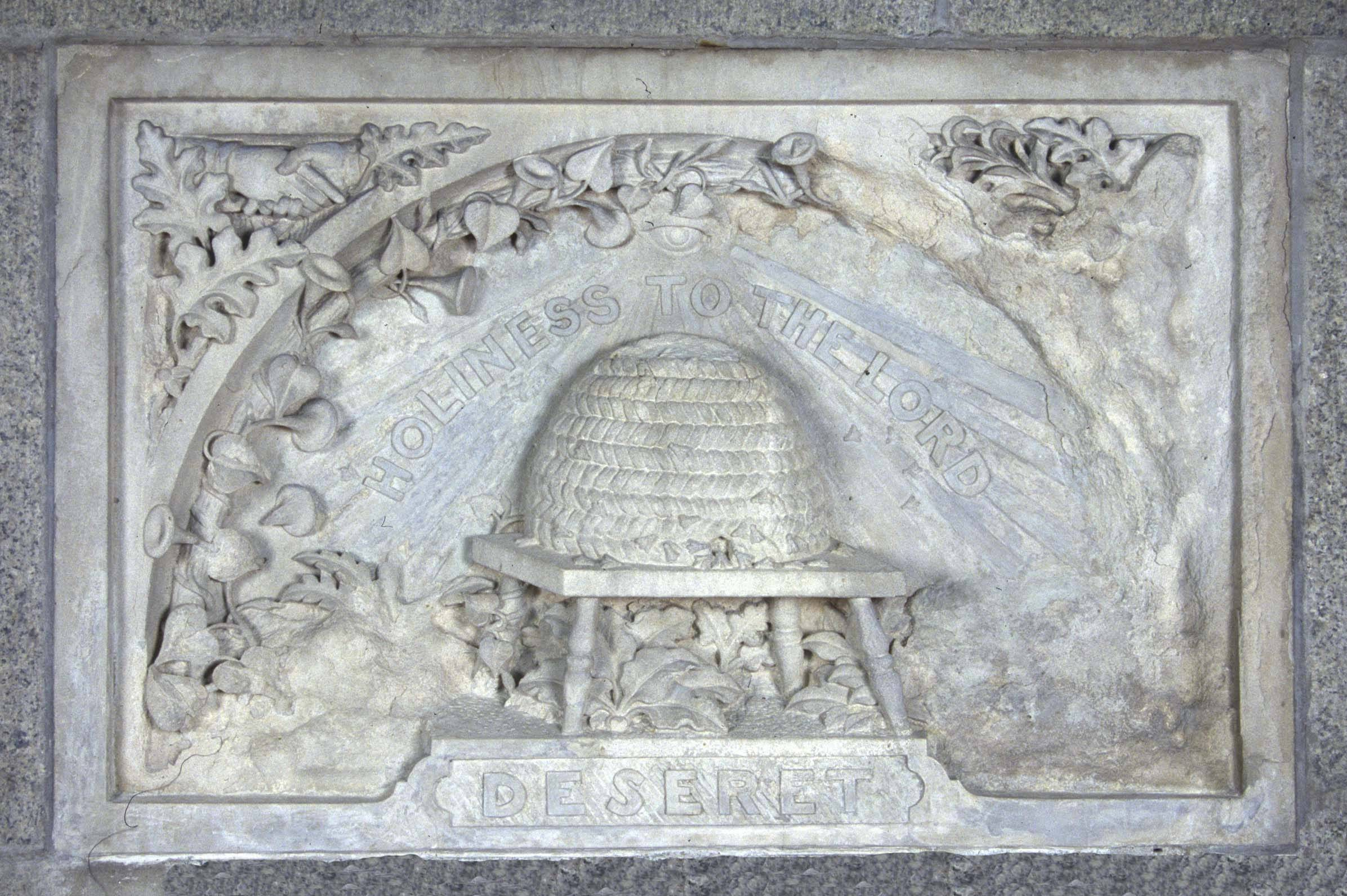
The Deseret Stone used in the construction of the Washington Monument. The stone was donated by the territory in 1853 to represent the provisional state. The Word Deseret is from the Book of Ether.

Ether's account, which Moroni abridged into the Book of Ether, is found in the 24 plates discovered by the people of Limhi in the Book of Mosiah.

Ether's grandfather Moron had been king of the Jaredites. Moron was overthrown and "dwelt in captivity all the remainder of his days". Ether's father, Coriantor, was born while his father was captive and Coriantor "dwelt in captivity all his days". Ether "was a prophet of the Lord" and "lived in the days of Coriantumr; and Coriantumr was king over all the land". He sees and prophesies many things but the people reject his teachings because they refuse to believe what they have not seen for themselves. Because of their rejection, Ether retreats to hide in a cave and record what happens to his people. He is later sent by the Lord to prophesy to King Coriantumr that he and his family can be saved if they will repent, but is again rejected. At the end of his record, Ether reflects on whether he will be translated to heaven or die like a normal man.

== Teachings ==
=== Polygamy ===
According to Daniel H. Ludlow, it is not clear whether or not the Jaredites were commanded by the Lord to practice polygamy. The following evidences have been cited which might indicate that they did practice polygamy:

- Many of the men had large numbers of sons and daughters. For example, the brother of Jared had 22 sons and daughters (Ether 6:20) and Orihah had 31 sons and daughters (Ether 7:2).
- Riplakish had "many wives and concubines" (Ether 10:5). He was condemned by the Lord for his wickedness, but it is not clear whether or not this condemnation was because of his "many wives."
- In Ether 14:2 it states that "every man kept the hilt of his sword in his right hand, in the defence of his property and his own life and of his wives and children." This verse seems to indicate that the people practiced polygamy, but whether or not it was sanctioned by the Lord is not made clear in the record.

=== Cycle of Righteousness ===
Ether 9:15–35 shows a pattern repeated many times in the Book of Mormon:

1. During the righteous reigns of Emer and Coriantum the people prospered exceedingly (v. 15–25)
2. Under the reign of Heth, the people began to join together in secret combinations, and they turned to wickedness (v. 26–27)
3. The Lord sent prophets to warn the people of their terrible circumstances (v. 28)
4. The people of Heth rejected the prophets (v. 29)
5. The judgments of God fell upon the people (v. 30–33)
6. The people humbled themselves and repented and the Lord blessed them again with prosperity (v. 34–35)

The Jaredites were able to be wealthy and remain righteous for more than 100 years (see v. 15–25).

=== Secret Combinations ===
In Ether 8:18–22 four claims about secret combinations are made:

1. Secret combinations are wicked and forbidden of the Lord (v. 18–19)
2. Secret combinations are "had among all people" (v. 20)
3. Secret combinations "caused the destruction" of both the Jaredite and Nephite nations (v. 21)
4. Whatever nation upholds secret combinations "shall be destroyed" (v. 22)

=== New Jerusalem ===
In Ether 13:1–12 claims about the New Jerusalem are made:

1. It will be "the holy sanctuary of the Lord" (Ether 13:3)
2. It will be built on the American continent for the remnant of the seed of Joseph (v. 4–6)
3. It will be a holy city like the Jerusalem built unto the Lord (v. 8–9)
4. It will stand until the earth is celestialized (v. 8)
5. It will be a city for the pure and righteous (v. 10)

== Comparison with Moroni ==
The last prophet called of God to warn the Jaredite nation and to witness against them was Ether, the son of Coriantor. H. Donl Peterson notes that Moroni could have empathized with Ether, since both were prophets of God sent to preach to a people who were "past feeling" and who "did reject all the words of the prophets" (Ether 11:23). Both men were the last of their once great civilizations, and both were called upon to record their final struggles and then were charged to be responsible for preserving the precious records of their fallen people.

== Lineage ==
Moron (Note: Ether 1:8)	(unnamed)
Coriantor (Note: Ether 1:7)	(unnamed)
Ether (Note: Ether 1:6)

== See also ==
- List of Book of Mormon prophets
- Mahonri Moriancumer, the brother of Jared
