= Fragmentary hypothesis =

The fragmentary hypothesis may refer to:

- The fragmentary hypothesis of the Pentateuch as an alternative to the documentary hypothesis or supplementary hypothesis
- Multi-source hypothesis of the formation of the Synoptic Gospels
