= Jaredites =

People mentioned in the Book of Mormon

The Jaredites (/ˈdʒærədaɪt/) are one of four peoples (along with the Nephites, Lamanites, and Mulekites) described in the Book of Mormon as having settled in the ancient Americas.

In the Book of Mormon (mainly its Book of Ether), the Jaredites were described as the descendants of Jared and his brother, who lived at the time of the Tower of Babel. According to the Book of Mormon, they fled across the ocean on unique barges and established an ancient civilization in America.

== Book of Ether narrative ==
According to the Book of Mormon, the Jaredites are the descendants of Jared, his brother, their immediate family, and their friends. (Joseph Smith later identified the brother of Jared as Mahonri Moriancumer.) At the time of the Tower of Babel, when the tongues of all nations were confounded, the Lord acceded to the desires of Jared, and his people's language was not confounded. The people were also granted a land of promise.

The Lord guided the people through the wilderness and were eventually directed to cross the sea in "barges". The vessels were sealed and watertight and able to be swamped by waves without sinking. Air was obtained from outside the vessels, as needed. They also brought with them animals and food. The recorded length of the trip was 344 days. Among other things they carried in their voyage were honeybees, which, in the language of the Jaredites were called "deseret".

Ether is the last in the royal line that began with one of the sons of Jared. From the time of the first king to the destruction of the Jaredites, there were only occasional periods of peace and prosperity. The times of peace were interrupted by intrigue over the throne, civil war, and the accession of wicked kings. The history of the Jaredites confirmed the fears of Jared and his brother that a monarchy would lead to evil.

The Book of Mormon claims that the Jaredites grew to become a civilization that exceeded two million people before its destruction. They finally destroyed themselves about the time Lehi and the other refugees from Jerusalem arrived in America. A prophecy of Ether was fulfilled: the last Jaredite king, Coriantumr, lived to see both the total destruction of his entire house, the scattering of the remaining Jaredites, and the arrival of another people to inherit the land.

=== Other references in Book of Mormon ===
Outside the Book of Ether, the Book of Mormon relates that Coriantumr was found by the Mulekites. The Nephites later encountered the Mulekites and taught them the Nephite language. The Mulekites told them that Coriantumr had died some nine months after he had come to live with them. The Nephite prophet King Mosiah I was able to translate a large stone with engravings that gave an account of Coriantumr. Another record on twenty-four plates, discovered by the people of King Limhi, was translated by the Nephite King Mosiah II. An abridged account of the Jaredite records was later included by Moroni, as the Book of Ether, in the Book of Mormon.

== Geography ==
The ocean crossed is not specified in the Book of Mormon. Hugh Nibley's There were Jaredites and The World of the Jaredites argue for the Pacific Ocean, but Milton R. Hunter argues for the Atlantic Ocean.

The location of the Jaredite's civilization is also not specified in the Book of Mormon except that it was north of a narrow neck of land in what was called the "Land Northward" by the Nephites. The New World location of the Jaredites and Nephites is a subject of disagreement among Mormons. Joseph Smith indicated that the Jaredites arrived in "the lake country of America" and that "the Nephites... lived about the narrow neck of land, which now embraces Central America, with all the cities that can be found."

== Proposed relations ==
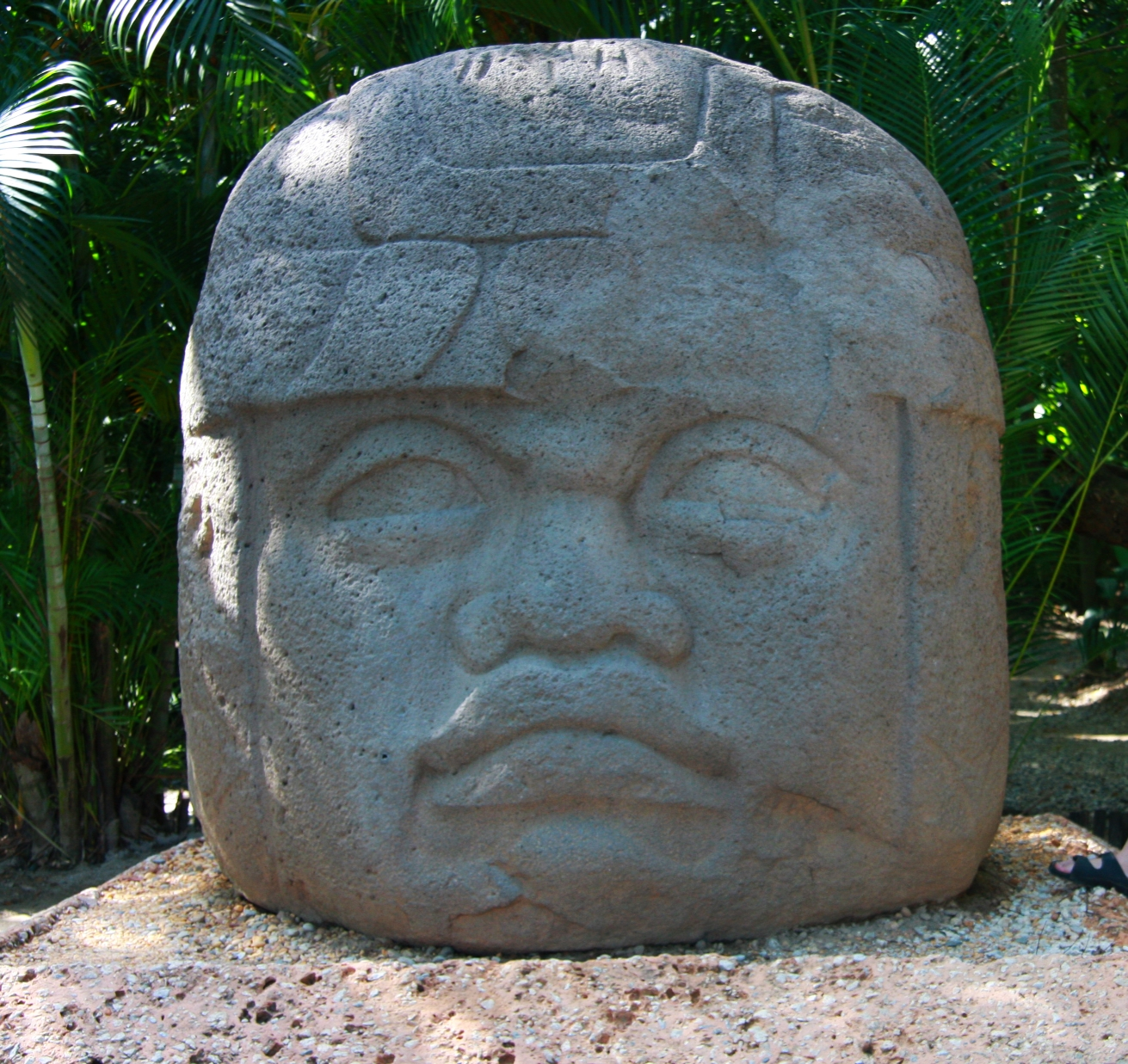
Some LDS have argued for the Jaredites as the ancestors of the Olmec civilization.

=== Descendants of Ham ===
Some early Latter Day Saints, including Apostle Parley P. Pratt believed the Jaredites were descendants of Ham, based on the group's origins near the Tower of Babel, and initial migration into the Valley of Nimrod, an area associated with the descendants of Ham.

== Sources ==
- Petersen, Mark E. (1984), The Jaredites, Deseret Book Co, ISBN 0-87747-998-4
- Nibley, Hugh (1988), Lehi in the Desert/The World of the Jaredites/There Were Jaredites, Deseret Book Co, ISBN 0-87579-132-8, archived from the original on 2013-12-20
- Brinley, Douglas E. (1995). "The Jaredites—A Case Study in Following the Brethren". In Nyman, Monte S.; Tate, Charles D. Jr. (eds.). Fourth Nephi, From Zion to Destruction. Provo, Utah: Religious Studies Center, Brigham Young University. pp. 45–59. ISBN 0-88494-974-5. OCLC 32500560. Archived from the original on 2013-10-22.
- Judd, Frank F. (1995). "Jaredite Zion Societies: Hope for a Better World". In Nyman, Monte S.; Tate, Charles D. Jr. (eds.). Fourth Nephi, From Zion to Destruction. Provo, Utah: Religious Studies Center, Brigham Young University. pp. 147–52. ISBN 0-88494-974-5. OCLC 32500560. Archived from the original on 2013-10-22.
