= Brother of Jared =

Figure in the Book of Mormon

In the Book of Mormon, the Brother of Jared is the most prominent person in the account given in the beginning (Chapters 1–6) of the Book of Ether. The Brother of Jared's name is not given in the text of the Book of Mormon, but Joseph Smith stated in 1834 that it was Mahonri Moriancumer.

== Name ==
In an 1835 letter, Oliver Cowdery parenthetically gives the name of the brother of Jared as "Moriancumer", which appears in the Book of Ether in the Book of Mormon only as a place name. A later account describes an 1834 statement by Joseph Smith in which he said that the brother of Jared's name had been revealed to him as "Mahonri Moriancumer":

While residing in Kirtland Elder Reynolds Cahoon had a son born to him. One day when President Joseph Smith was passing his door he called the Prophet in and asked him to bless and name the baby. Joseph did so and gave the boy the name of Mahonri Moriancumer. When he had finished the blessing he laid the child on the bed, and turning to Elder Cahoon he said, the name I have given your son is the name of the Brother of Jared; the Lord has just shown [or revealed] it to me. Elder William F. Cahoon, who was standing near, heard the Prophet make this statement to his father; and this was the first time the name of the brother of Jared was known in the Church in this dispensation.

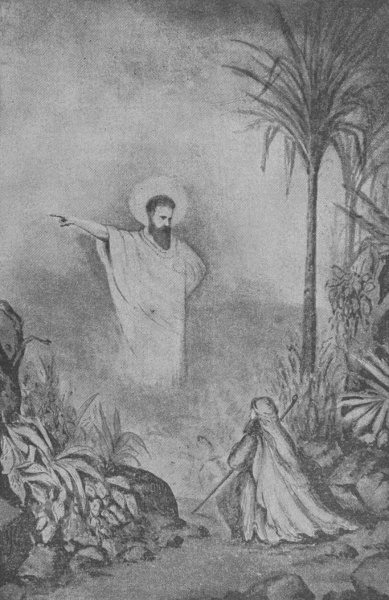
The Brother of Jared seeing Christ in a vision

Etymologies have been proposed but remain largely speculative.

According to Daniel H. Ludlow, it is not clear why the name of the Brother of Jared does not appear in the Book of Mormon. However, the following are possible reasons:

- The Brother of Jared may have omitted his name out of modesty (John the Beloved did essentially the same thing in the Gospel of John, which he is traditionally said to have written);
- The Book of Ether is clearly a family record of Jared, not the Brother of Jared; Ether, the final writer and perhaps the abridger of the record, was a descendant of Jared and might naturally have emphasized the achievements of his direct ancestor rather than the brother of his ancestor;
- Moroni may have omitted the name in his abridgment because of difficulty in translating (or "transliterating") the name into the Nephite language;
- In Ancient Rome, damnatio memoriae meant names were intentionally deleted from the public record. Ancient Egyptian factions also expunged names and statues of heretical rivals. In Ether 11:17–18, a direct descendant of the Brother of Jared, and rival king, is also not named.

== See also ==
- List of names for the biblical nameless
- Mahonri Young, American sculptor named after the brother of Jared
