= Book of Ether =

Book in the Book of Mormon describing the Jaredites

The Book of Ether (/ˈiːθər/) is one of the books of the Book of Mormon. It describes the Jaredites, descendants of Jared and his companions, who were led by God to the Americas shortly after the confusion of tongues and the destruction of the Tower of Babel. Ether consists of fifteen chapters.

The title refers to Ether, a Jaredite prophet who, according to the Book of Mormon, lived at the end of the period covered by the book, believed to be circa 2600 or 2100 BC through 600 BC or later, at least 1500 but possibly as long as 2500 years.

== Narrative ==
Jared and his people were among the many scattered peoples from the destruction of the Tower of Babel. The brother of Jared is described as "a large and mighty man ... highly favored of the Lord", and seems to have been the spiritual leader of the group. He was given a vision of the history of the world, and inscribed prophecies, which were "sealed up" until the Lord decides to reveal them. The Lord told the brother of Jared to build unpowered submarines, termed "barges" or "vessels", to cross the ocean to the promised land. The barges could circulate fresh air because of openings in the top and bottom of the vessel. The hole in the top could be "stopped up" when the waves crashed over the vessel to prevent scuttling. The hole in the bottom is assumed to have been constructed as a sort of moon pool with the lip above the waterline so it would not flood the vessel. This would also allow wave action and the buoying of the vessel to pump fresh air in and out of the vessel when the upper opening was uncapped.

Because the vessels could not sustain fire or windows for light, the brother of Jared went to a mountain and prayed for help. God touched several molten stones and made them shine. Because of the brother of Jared's great faith, he saw the finger of God. He then saw and spoke with Jehovah. The people launched the vessels and traveled through great storms. After 344 days, they arrived at the Americas. Jared and his brother led the people to successfully establish a righteous nation.

== Provenance ==
As the story is told in the Book of Mormon, what later was named the Book of Ether was taken from a set of twenty-four plates written by Ether and discovered by the people of Limhi during the time of King Mosiah (son of King Benjamin). Joseph Smith claimed the book was abridged by Moroni onto the golden plates, which Joseph Smith claimed to translate into English.

However, according to Daniel H. Ludlow, it is not clarified in the Book of Mormon whether Moroni made his abridgment of the record of Ether from Mosiah's earlier translation or whether Moroni took his account directly from the plates of Ether—in which case Joseph Smith would have needed to translate the record as well as abridge it.

== See also ==
- Anachronisms in the Book of Mormon
- Historicity of the Book of Mormon
- Linguistics and the Book of Mormon

== Notes ==
Book of Ether Additions by Moroni
| Preceded by Mormon | Book of Mormon | Succeeded by Moroni |
