= Tree of life vision =

Vision described in the Book of Mormon

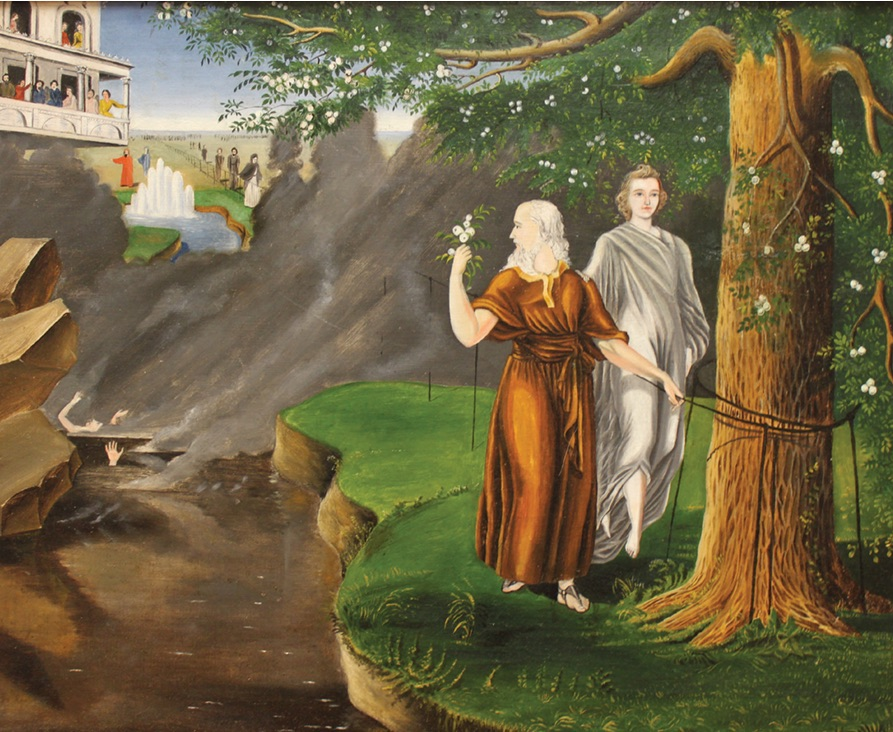
Lehi's Dream, painting by David Hyrum Smith

The tree of life vision is, according to the Book of Mormon, a vision received in a dream by the prophet Lehi, and later in vision by his son Nephi, who wrote about it in the First Book of Nephi. The vision includes a path leading to a tree of life symbolizing salvation, with an iron rod along the path whereby followers of Jesus may hold to the rod and avoid wandering off the path into pits or waters, symbolizing the ways of sin. The vision also includes a large building where the wicked look down on the righteous and mock them.

The vision is said to symbolize the spiritual plight of humanity and is a well-known and cited story among members of the Church of Jesus Christ of Latter-day Saints (LDS Church). Corbin T. Volluz, a Latter-day Saint lawyer, reflected a common belief of church members that the vision is "one of the richest, most flexible, and far-reaching pieces of symbolic prophecy contained in the standard works [scriptures]."

== Synopsis ==
According to the Book of Mormon, the prophet Lehi received the vision in a dream during his exile in the Arabian wilderness sometime after 600 B.C. He awoke and recounted it to his children as described in the 8th chapter of the First Book of Nephi. Lehi's son, Nephi, recorded the vision on the golden plates, and later had the same vision, albeit a more detailed version, which he records later in the same book. Nephi's vision also included an interpretation of the vision.

In the vision, Lehi is in a "dark and dreary" wilderness, where he follows a man in a white robe to a "dark and dreary waste" where he travels in darkness. After praying for mercy, he sees a tree next to a river and eats its fruit, which makes him joyful. Wishing to share the fruit with his family, he sees his wife, Sariah, and two sons, Nephi and Sam, who come and eat it with him. His two oldest sons, Laman and Lemuel, stay near the river and do not eat the fruit. Then Lehi sees a "rod of iron" and a "strait and narrow path" which leads to the tree. People try to get to the tree, but are lost in the "mist of darkness". Some are able to hold to the rod and make it to the tree, but they are ashamed when they eat the fruit. Across the river, a "great and spacious building" is full of people who are making fun of the people who ate the fruit, and subsequently, the fruit-eaters become lost.

== Importance ==
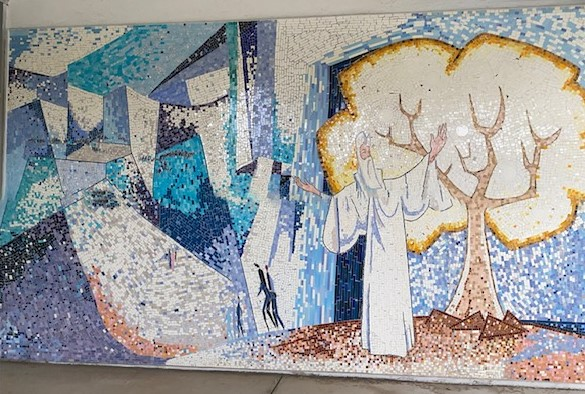
Left side of tree of life mosaic at the LDS chapel in Newport Beach, California.

The story of the vision is well known among members of the LDS Church and is widely cited. The "rod of iron" specifically is mentioned often referring to the scriptures or the words of the Lord, in order to convey the importance of heeding God's teachings.

== Interpretation ==
Book of Mormon scholars have used multiple interpretive lenses to interpret the tree of life vision, which were popular in different eras of Book of Mormon scholarship. Historical interpretations were popular from the mid-1940s up through the 1980s. In his summary of tree of life visions in Approaching the Tree, Joseph Spencer writes that the first academic analysis of the vision was in Sidney Sperry's Our Book of Mormon (1947), which described Lehi's dream as a type of "symbolic prophecy". Hugh Nibley placed the dream in an ancient eastern context, stating that the elements of the vision reflected Lehi's experience wandering the deserts of Arabia, and large fields were reminiscent of desert plains.

Literary interpretations of the vision started in the 1970s. Writing in 1977, Brigham Young University (BYU) English professor Bruce Jorgensen introduced an interpretation of the tree of life vision as a key to understanding the Book of Mormon's typological unity. Lehi's dream enacts the pattern of moving from a wasteland to a land of promise, a pattern which occurs several times in the Book of Mormon, both in earthly and spiritual realities. Alma's experience being dramatically converted by an angel reflects a transformation from darkness into light. Alma's sermon on faith compares faith to a seed that can grow into a "tree springing up unto everlasting life". He tells his listeners that they can "taste the light". These references are, for Jorgensen, clear allusions to the tree of life vision. He sees Jacob's Parable of the Olive Tree as the other side of the figural coin to Lehi's dream.

BYU religion professor Charles Swift sees the vision as part of visionary literature. Citing Leland Ryken's work, Swift shows that visionary literature, including the tree of life vision, includes a strange, imaginary other world rich in symbolism, a reversal of ordinary reality, elements of transcendence, and a "kaleidoscopic" structure. There are imaginative elements in the vision: the fruit doesn't fill Lehi's stomach, but his heart; a rod of iron appears in the wilderness, not attached to another structure; the great and spacious building floats in the air. The reversals include subverting our expectations, like the guide taking Lehi to another dreary wilderness and people who eat the fruit but are ashamed and become lost. Elements of disconnect are when objects like the rod suddenly appear, and when scenes and groups of people do not interact with one another.

For Salleh and Hemming, writing in The Book of Mormon for the Least of These, Nephi's vision provides a notable inversion of God's covenant with Abraham. Rather than his descendants being preserved, as Abraham's were, God promises that Nephi's descendants will be destroyed. Salleh and Hemming see this as a challenge to Nephi to realize that his record and the gospel are for all humans, not just his bloodline. This is a theme that comes up again later in the Book of Mormon.

=== Symbolism ===
As interpreted by Nephi to his brothers, the tree of life and represents God's love, the rod of iron represent the "word of God," the great and spacious building represents the "pride of the world," the river represents the "depths of hell," and the mists of darkness represent the "temptations of the devil." For Volluz, there is an additional layer of symbolism to the vision. Writing in the Journal of Book of Mormon Studies, he sees the entire tree of life vision as a symbolic version of the vision of the future Nephi receives later. When the angel in Nephi's vision explains the symbolism of various parts of Lehi's vision, Nephi juxtaposes the explanations with Nephi's vision of the future. The explanation of the symbolism of the tree as the love of God is followed by a vision of Christ's birth. The living water represents the baptism of Jesus, with the rod of iron representing his ministry. The "multitudes" who gather to fight against the apostles correspond to those gathered in the large and spacious building, with its fall representing the scattering of the house of Israel. Volluz further interprets the three different groups of people in Lehi's dream as Nephi's descendants who are destroyed in wickedness, come to Christ and fall away, or who come to Christ and remain. In the same article, Volluz offers another symbolic possibility of the vision: as corresponding to the events in the afterlife, with the righteous and unrighteous parted by the river representing the justice of God, the iron rod acting as the judgement "bar," and the righteous partaking of the fruit representing eternal life.

Amy Easton-Flake, a religion professor at BYU, uses the same metaphor between the visions of Lehi and Nephi, but with a different interpretation. Using the "word of God" as a name of Christ, she interprets the rod of iron as a symbol for Christ. Christ performs multiple functions in the vision, also being symbolized by the fountain of living water and the tree of life. Nephi uses language as a shorthand for corresponding parts of Nephi's and Lehi's vision, like when the children of men fall down and worship Christ, and when people in Lehi's dream fall down and eat the fruit. The large and spacious field symbolizes the land promised to Lehi and, according to Daniel L. Belnap, becomes a new narrative for Lehi's family. The great and spacious building becomes a symbol of the Nephites and Lamanites battling one another, and the mist of darkness symbolizes the actual darkness that covers the land at the time of Jesus' death in the Book of Mormon. The great and spacious building represents the "great and abominable church", etc.

== Claims by Mormons of Mesoamerican parallels ==
=== Izapa Stela 5 ===
Latter-day Saint archaeologist M. Wells Jakeman wrote in 1958 that Izapa Stela 5 is a depiction of the tree of life vision. Jakeman's theory was popular for a time among Mormons, but found little support from Mormon apologists. Professor of Pre-Columbian Mesoamerican Art, Julia Guernsey, wrote that Jakeman's research "belies an obvious religious agenda that ignored Izapa Stela 5's heritage".

Izapa Stela 5

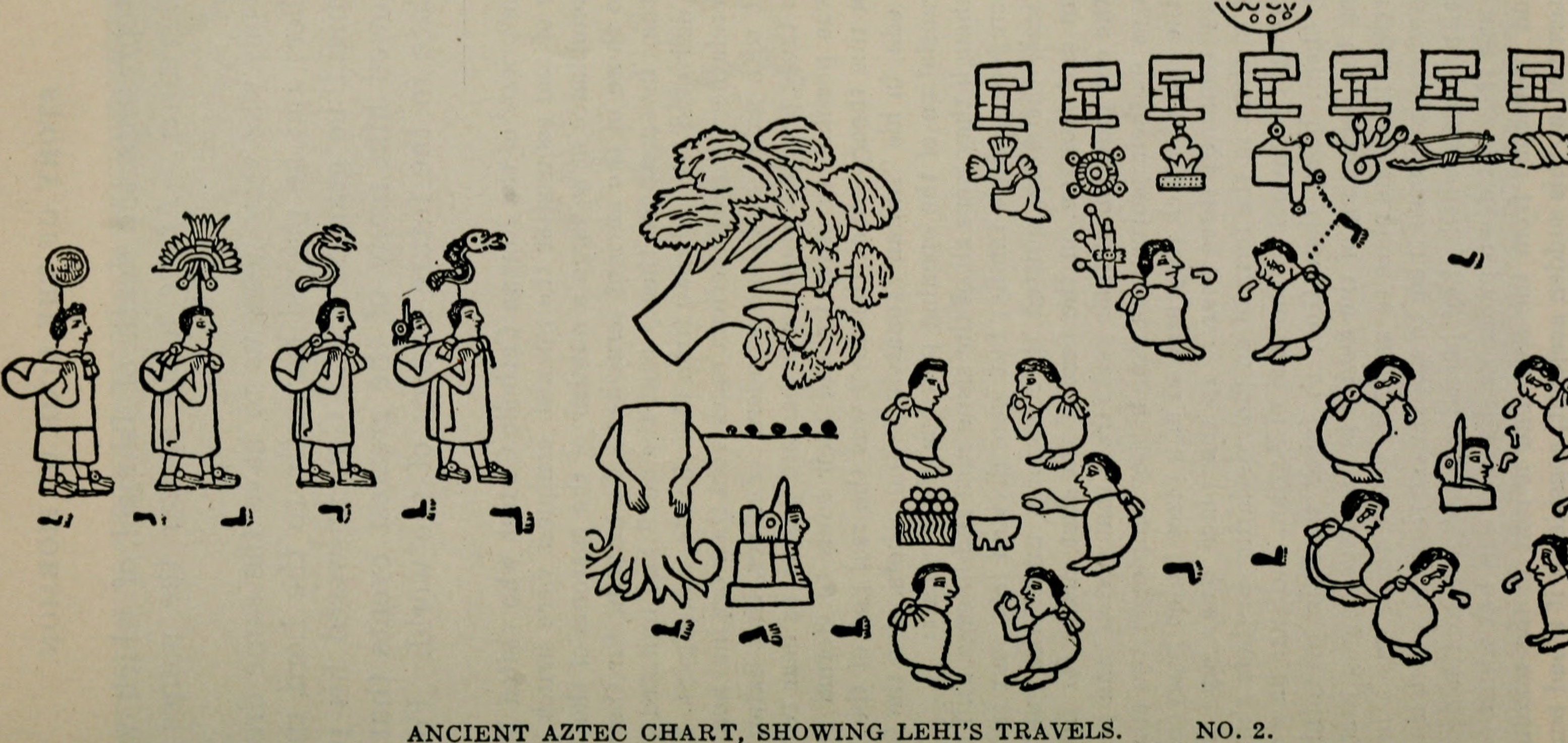
Codex Boturini, folios 2–3, as presented in The Story of the Book of Mormon

=== Codex Boturini ===
In a March 1845 edition of the LDS Newspaper The Prophet, a passage stated Codex Boturini was said to be the story of the Aztecs coming to America. In his book The Story of the Book of Mormon (published in 1888), LDS Church general authority George Reynolds interpreted folios 2-3 of Codex Boturini to be a representation of Lehi's dream. In this interpretation, of the group of five people closest to the tree, three are Sariah, Sam, and Nephi eating its fruit, and the other two are Laman and Lemuel refusing to eat. Further to the right, the death of Ishmael is depicted. However, the people and broken tree illustrated in these folios depicts the migration of the Azteca, later Mexica, people from Aztlán. Its date of manufacture is unknown, but likely to have occurred before or just after the Conquest of the Aztec Empire (1519–1521). The figure to the immediate right of the tree trunk is the Aztec god Huitzilopochtli.

== Joseph Smith Sr's dream ==
Lucy Mack Smith, Joseph Smith's mother, recorded a visionary dream from Joseph Smith Sr. in Biographical Sketches of Joseph Smith the Prophet with many similarities to the tree of life vision. It contained a tree with delicious fruit, a path, and a large building where the wicked looked down in scorn of the righteous. According to Lucy, Joseph Sr. had this dream prior to publication of the Book of Mormon. However, her biographical sketches were written and published after the publication of the Book of Mormon, so the direction of influence (whether Joseph Smith Sr.'s dream influenced Joseph Smith Jr.'s translation of the Book of Mormon or the Book of Mormon influenced Lucy's retelling of the dream) is uncertain. Fawn Brodie noticed these similarities in her book No Man Knows My History, stating that a "reverse borrowing is unlikely" because Lucy Mack Smith had "probably" told the story of the dream many times before. In Joseph Smith: The Making of a Prophet, Dan Vogel wrote that Lucy's interpretation of her husband's dream was "probably inspired by the Book of Mormon."

== See also ==
- Tree of life
- Tree of life (biblical)
- Tree of the knowledge of good and evil

== Works cited ==
- Clark, John (31 January 1999). "A New Artistic Rendering of Izapa Stela 5: A Step toward Improved Interpretation". Journal of Book of Mormon Studies. 8 (1): 22–77. doi:10.2307/44758886. ISSN 2374-4766. JSTOR 44758886.
- Easton-Flake, Amy (2011). Lehi's Dream as a Template for Understanding Each Act of Nephi's Vision. Provo, UT: Religious Studies Center, Brigham Young University. ISBN 9781609087388.
- Guernsey, Julia (2006). Ritual and Power in Stone: The Performance of Rulership in Mesoamerican Izapan Style Art. Austin, TX: University of Texas Press. ISBN 9780292713239.
- Jakeman, M. Wells (1958). Stela 5, Izapa, Chiapas, Mexico: A major archaeological discovery of the new world; detailed commentary on the carving. Provo, UT: University Archaeological Society, Brigham Young University.
- Smith, Lucy Mack (1853), Biographical Sketches of Joseph Smith the Prophet, and His Progenitors for Many Generations, Liverpool: S.W. Richards, pp. 58–59
- Jorgensen, Bruce W. (1981). Lambert, Neal E. (ed.). The Dark Way to the Tree: Typological Unity in the Book of Mormon. Provo, UT: Religious Studies Center, Brigham Young University. ISBN 0884944093.
- Salleh, Fatimah; Hemming, Margaret Olsen (2020). The Book of Mormon for the Least of These. Vol. 1. Common Consent Press. ISBN 978-1-948218-23-8.
- Spencer, Joseph (2023). "Wandering in Strange Roads: Interpretations of Lehi's Dream". In Spencer, Joseph; Champoux, Jennifer; Keogh, Benjamin (eds.). Approaching the Tree: Interpreting 1 Nephi 8. Deseret Book.
- Swift, Charles (2005). "Lehi's Vision of the Tree of Life: Understanding the Dream as Visionary Literature". Journal of Book of Mormon Studies. 14 (2): 60. doi:10.5406/jbookmormstud.14.2.0052.
- Dan Vogel (2004), Joseph Smith: The Making of a Prophet, OL 4982922W, Wikidata Q6287041
- Volluz, Corbin T. (1993). "Lehi's Dream of the Tree of Life: Springboard to Prophecy". Journal of Book of Mormon Studies. 2 (2): 14–38. doi:10.2307/44758919. JSTOR 44758919.
