= The Book of Mormon Movie =

The Book of Mormon Movie, Volume 1: The Journey
- DVD cover
- Directed by: Gary Rogers
- Written by: Gary Rogers; Craig Clyde
- Produced by: Gary Rogers
- Starring: Noah Danby; Bryce Chamberlain (Note: Bryce Chamberlain had earlier played the roles of Laban and, in revival, Nephi in the pageant People of the Book.); Jan Broberg Felt; Cragun Foulger; Mark Gollaher; Kirby Heyborne; Bruce Newbold; Bern Kubiak
- Cinematography: Neal Brown
- Edited by: Ira Baker; David Hales
- Music by: Robert C. Bowden
- Production company: Mormon Movies
- Distributed by: Halestone Distribution
- Release date: September 12, 2003
- Running time: 119 minutes
- Country: United States
- Language: English
- Budget: $1.5 million
- Box office: $1.7 million

The Book of Mormon Movie, Volume 1: The Journey is a 2003 American adventure drama film directed by Gary Rogers and written by Rogers and Craig Clyde. A film adaptation of the first two books in the Book of Mormon, the film was given a limited theatrical release on September 12, 2003.

== Plot ==
The film is based on the first two books of the Book of Mormon: First Nephi and Second Nephi. The source material contains much theological discussion, and parables, some of which have been cut from the adaptation due to their unsuitability as narrative material. Some of the visionary material is retained.

The film starts in Jerusalem around 600 BC, where the audience meets patriarch Lehi, his wife Sariah, and their four sons: Laman, Lemuel, Sam, and Nephi. Lehi and his wife are devout believers in God, as are their sons, Nephi and Sam. Laman and Lemuel are more wayward and do not tend to agree with the commands of God or their father and brother Nephi.

While in Jerusalem, Lehi prophesies that the city will be destroyed. This elicits a negative reaction from many people, to the point of their wanting to kill him. The family flees into the desert at this point and becomes nomadic.

While in the wilderness, Lehi sends Nephi and his brothers back to Jerusalem to try to get hold of the Brass Plates, as commanded by God. The Brass Plates are inscribed with ancient scriptures and records that they need to take with them on their journey and which will form part of the basis of the Book of Mormon.

However, these plates are within the compound of a powerful and violent man called Laban, who has many men under his command. They first try to persuade Laban to hand over the plates, but eventually a fight ensues and they are forced to flee. One of Laban's servants, Zoram, ends up defecting to Lehi's side and joins his family in the desert.

Ishmael and Lehi's families intermarry, but Ishmael dies in the Arabian wilderness. The group is ordered to build a boat to take them to the new Promised Land, which they do with limited resources. Laman and Lemuel once more start complaining about this idea, but they all end up boarding this ship and leaving the Old World for the New.

They arrive in the New World after this voyage, but the quarrel within the family continues. After Lehi dies in the promised land, Laman and Lemuel, and their families, rebel again, and turn to evil things. The Lamanites separate from the Nephites. Because of this, Nephi and his allies have to escape them, and once more go into the wilderness.

== Cast ==
- Noah Danby as Nephi
- Bryce Chamberlain as Lehi
- Jan Broberg Felt as Sariah
- Cragun Foulger as Lemuel
- Mark Gollaher as Laman
- Kirby Heyborne as Sam
- Sue Rowe as daughter of Lehi
- Bruce Newbold as Moroni
- Bern Kubiak as Jesus Christ
- Jacque Gray as Nephi's wife
- Ron Frederickson as Ishmael
- Todd Davis as Zoram
- Michael Flynn as Laban
- Richard J. Clifford as Lucan
- Brad Johnson as Jonathan

== Production ==
=== Development ===
Rogers's inspiration was the Cecil B. DeMille 1956 version of The Ten Commandments. He envisioned The Book of Mormon as one long historical epic. His plan was to make nine films that cover the entire story of the book.

The film's length is two hours, and it was revealed on the DVD commentary that the first cut of the film was two hours and forty minutes.

=== Casting ===
Noah Danby was cast as Nephi because of his strong resemblance to the art of Arnold Friberg, who created a series of paintings inspired by The Book of Mormon. He had never read the Book of Mormon prior to his casting. Danby is a devout Lutheran, and while at first he did not feel comfortable in making the film due to religious differences, he has said in an interview for The Hollywood Reporter that he took the role to gain experience as an actor.

=== Filming ===
The desert scenes were filmed in Utah in the spring, and it was very cold. The "great and spacious building" was a five-foot miniature. The boat does not appear in the theatrical version of the scene in which the family arrives in the promised land. It was digitally added to that scene for the DVD version.

Mike Ripplinger directed and filmed the behind-the-scenes portion on the DVD release.

The film was mentioned in Paul C. Gutjahrs 2012 book The Book of Mormon: A Biography.

== Release ==
The film was rated PG-13 for "a scene of violence", having contained an image of Nephi with blood splatter on his face after beheading Laban. This image was removed for home media releases, and the film received a PG rating on DVD.

=== Box office ===
Produced for $1.5 million, Book of Mormon opened in 29 theaters on September 12, 2003 and made $114,573 in its first weekend, ranking number 41 in the domestic box office. The film played for 35 weeks before closing on May 13, 2004, its widest release being 38 theaters, and it had grossed $1,680,020.

It is the fourth highest-grossing film in the history of LDS cinema.

=== Critical reception ===
The film was widely panned by Latter-day Saint and non-Latter-day Saint critics. Variety described it as "[w]ell meaning but often as tediously earnest as a Sunday sermon". In the Mormon Blogosphere, A Motley Vision gave it a grade of C−. In a 2010 literary study of the Book of Mormon, scholar Grant Hardy mentioned the film as "a not entirely successful attempt to bring the Book of Mormon to the big screen."^{:20}

Review aggregator website Rotten Tomatoes scored 17% of 6 critics giving the film a positive review.

== Soundtrack ==
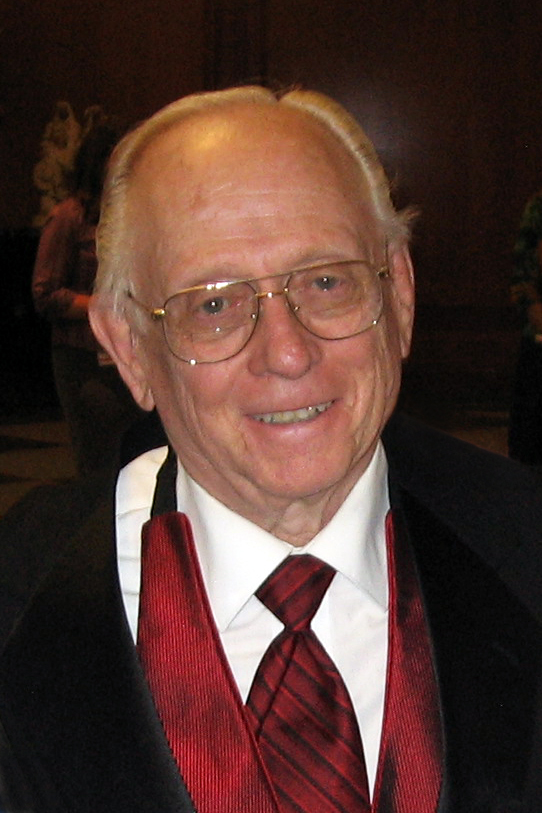
Robert C. Bowden, who was responsible for the music in this movie was the director of the Mormon Youth Symphony and Chorus.

Book Of Mormon Movie, Volume 1: The Journey

Soundtrack album by Robert C. Bowden
- Released: 2003
- Length: 1:06:08
- Labels: Mormon Movies, L.L.C.

1. "Prologue/Joseph Meets Moroni" (01:48)
2. "Main Theme" (02:31)
3. "Playing Ball" (00:19)
4. "I Nephi" (01:48)
5. "Lucan Gets Laban" (01:39)
6. "We Shall Never See This House Again" (01:32)
7. "Leaving Jerusalem" (01:34)
8. "In the Presence of Deity" (02:26)
9. "Brothers Return From Brass Plates" (01:38)
10. "Laman's Chase" (00:48)
11. "Nephi Sneaking Into Jerusalem" (02:15)
12. "Beheading of Laban" (02:28)
13. "Returned to the Tent of My Father" (00:38)
14. "Return for Ishmael's Family" (01:15)
15. "Love Theme" (03:37)
16. "Nephi's Vision" (03:26)
17. "Wedding & Celebration" (02:55)
18. "Wandering in the Desert" (02:36)
19. "Ishmael's Death/Bountiful" (03:03)
20. "Enticing" (01:35)
21. "Storm at Sea" (03:00)
22. "The Promised Land" (03:42)
23. "Lehi's Death" (03:33)
24. "Attack at Night" (00:48)
25. "I Miss My Brothers" (02:25)
26. "Sam's Journey" (00:53)
27. "Lamanites" (02:29)
28. "End Theme" (05:37)
29. "Forever Will Be" (03:50)
