= Izapa Stela 5 =

Maya sculptural monument

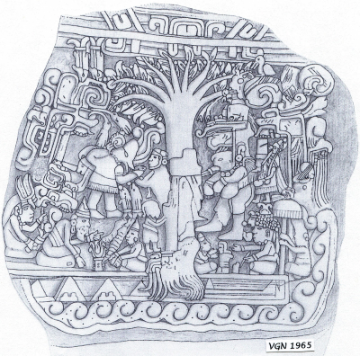
Izapa Stela 5 (V. Garth Norman 1965)

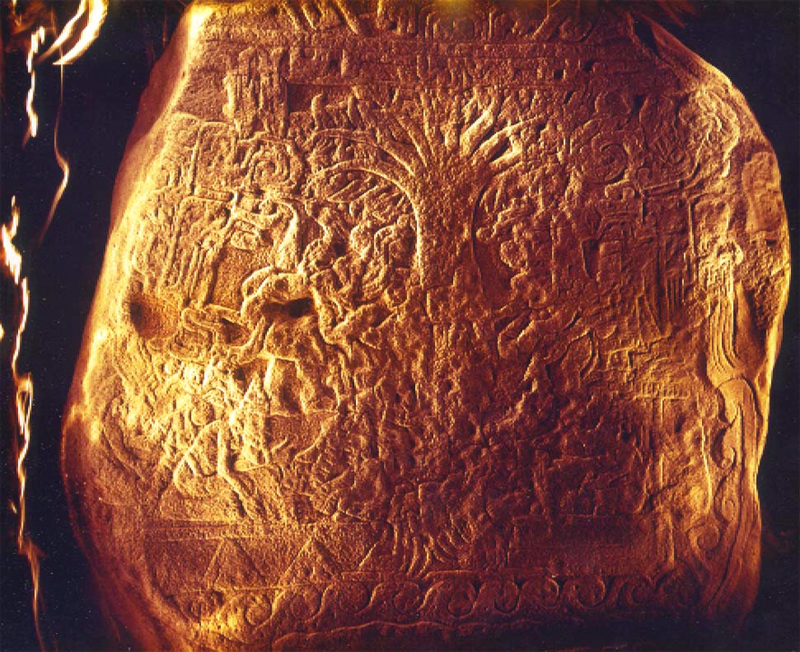
Night photography of stela 5 with acute side lighting relief of difficult to see details.

Izapa Stela 5 is one of a number of large, carved stelae found in the ancient Mesoamerican site of Izapa, in the Soconusco region of Chiapas, Mexico along the present-day Guatemalan border. These stelae date from roughly 300 BCE to 50 or 100 BCE, although some argue for dates as late as 250 CE.

Also known as the "Tree of Life" stone, it appears to illustrate a Mesoamerican creation myth.

== The stela ==
Documented by Smithsonian archaeologist Matthew W. Stirling in 1941, Stela 5 is composed of volcanic andesite and weighs around one-and-a-half tons. Stela 5 presents the most complex imagery of all the stelae at Izapa. Researcher Garth Norman, for example, has counted "at least 12" human figures, a dozen animals, over 25 botanical or inanimate objects, and 9 stylized deity masks.

Like much of Izapan monumental sculpture, the subject matter of Stela 5 is considered mythological and religious in nature and is executed with a stylized opulence. Given the multiple overlapping scenes, it appears to be a narrative.

== Interpretation ==
Mesoamerican researchers identify the central image as a Mesoamerican world tree, connecting the sky above and the water or underworld below.

=== As a creation myth ===
Linda Schele and Mary Ellen Miller further propose that the stela records a creation myth, with barely formed humans emerging from a hole drilled into the tree's left side. The associated seated figures are completing these humans in various ways. Julia Guernsey Kappelman, on the other hand, suggests the seated figures are Izapa elites conducting ritual activities in a "quasi-historical scene", which is framed by, and placed in the context of, the "symbolic landscape of creation".

=== Book of Mormon application ===
Based on parallels with traditions originating in the Old World, a few researchers have linked the stone to theories of pre-Columbian trans-oceanic contact. Church of Jesus Christ of Latter-day Saints archeologist M. Wells Jakeman proposed that the image was a representation of a tree of life vision found in the Book of Mormon. Jakeman's theory was popular for a time among members of the Church of Jesus Christ, but found little support from Church of Jesus Christ apologists. Julia Guernsey wrote that Jakeman's research "belies an obvious religious agenda that ignored Izapa Stela 5's heritage".
