= Mesoamerican world tree =

Arepa

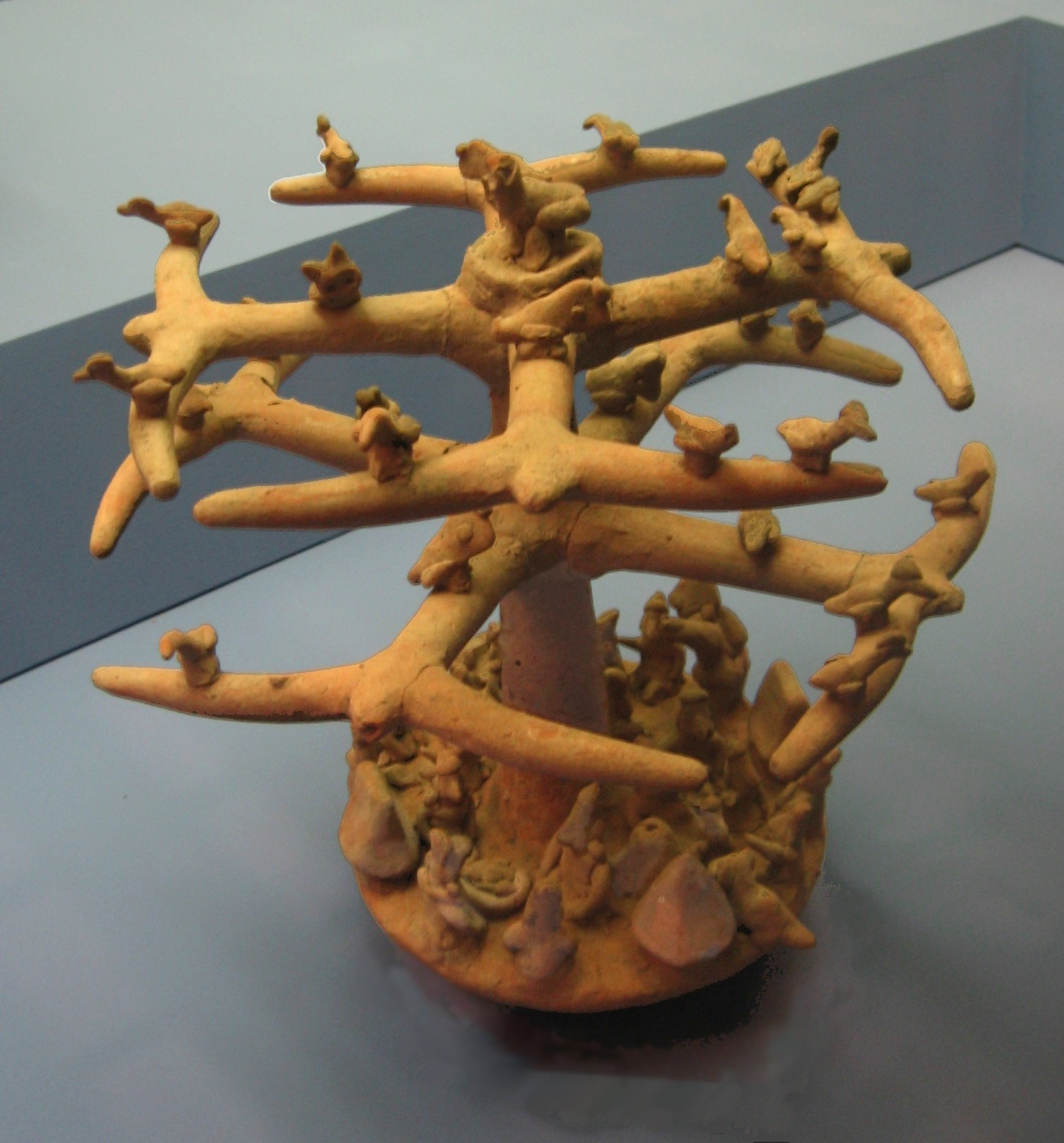
A tableau from the Western Mexico shaft tomb tradition, showing a multi-layered tree with birds. It has been proposed that the birds represent souls who have not yet descended into the underworld, while the central tree may represent the Mesoamerican world tree.

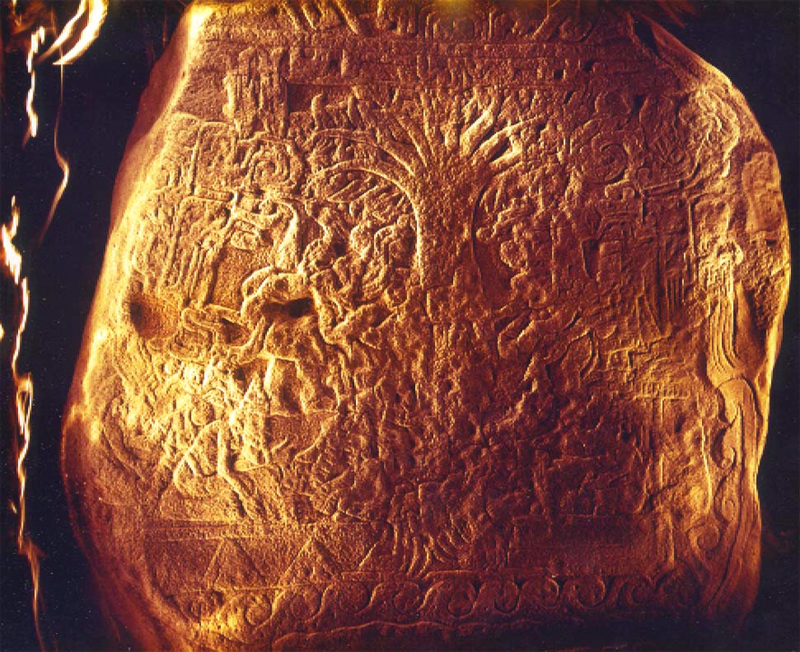
Tree of Life, Izapa Stela 5

World trees are a prevalent motif occurring in the mythical cosmologies, creation accounts, and iconographies of the pre-Columbian cultures of Mesoamerica. In the Mesoamerican context, world trees embodied the four cardinal directions, which also serve to represent the fourfold nature of a central world tree, a symbolic axis mundi which connects the planes of the Underworld and the sky with that of the terrestrial realm.

Depictions of world trees, both in their directional and central aspects, are found in the art and mythological traditions of cultures such as the Maya, Aztec, Izapan, Mixtec, Olmec, and others, dating to at least the Mid/Late Formative periods of Mesoamerican chronology. Among the Maya, the central world tree was conceived as or represented by a ceiba tree, and is known variously as a wacah chan or yax imix che, depending on the Mayan language. The trunk of the tree could also be represented by an upright caiman, whose skin evokes the tree's spiny trunk.

Directional world trees are also associated with the four Yearbearers in Mesoamerican calendars, and the directional colors and deities. Mesoamerican codices which have this association outlined include the Dresden, Borgia and Fejérváry-Mayer codices. It is supposed that Mesoamerican sites and ceremonial centers frequently had actual trees planted at each of the four cardinal directions, representing the quadripartite concept.

Izapa Stela 5 is considered a possible representation of a World Tree, as is the tree on Kʼinich Janaabʼ Pakal's sarcophagus at Palenque.

World trees are frequently depicted with birds in their branches, and their roots extending into earth or water (sometimes atop a "water-monster", symbolic of the underworld).

The central world tree has also been interpreted as a representation of the band of the Milky Way.

== See also ==
- Axis mundi
- Aztec mythology
- Maya mythology
- Olmec mythology
- Tree of life
- Vision Serpent
- Yggdrasil
