= Codex Boturini =

Aztec manuscript

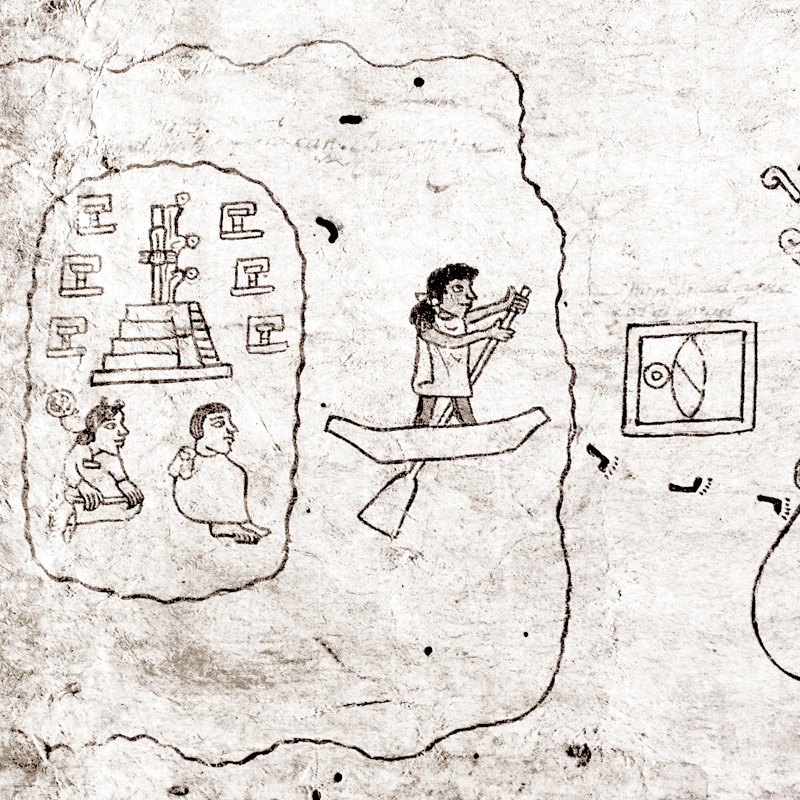
First page of the Boturini Codex

Codex Boturini, also known as the Tira de la Peregrinación de los Mexica (Tale of the Mexica Migration), is an Aztec codex, which depicts the migration of the Azteca, later Mexica, people from Aztlán. Its date of manufacture is unknown, but likely to have occurred before or just after the Conquest of the Aztec Empire (1519–1521). At least two other Aztec codices have been influenced by the content and style of the Boturini Codex. This Codex has become an insignia of Mexica history and pilgrimage and is carved into a stone wall at the entrance of the National Museum of Anthropology and History in Mexico City.

The codex is currently located in the National Museum of Anthropology in Mexico City.

== Name ==
This codex is referred to either as Codex Boturini or as the Tira de la Peregrinación de los Mexica. The former name comes from the 18th century Italian scholar and collector of Aztec manuscripts, Lorenzo Boturini Benaduci.

== Characteristics ==
The codex consists of a single 549 cm (216 in) long and 19.8 cm (7.8 in) high sheet of amate, folded like an accordion into 21.5 sheets 25.4 cm (10.0 in) wide on average.

The tlacuilo who fashioned the Boturini Codex was familiar with the Aztec writing system. The style consistency of the images suggested that the codex had a single author. The alphabetic writing in the codex, also in Nahuatl, appears to have been added later.

The codex appears to be unfinished, as it was never painted with more than the red ink used to link the date blocks. (Note: The lack of quality color prints of Codex Boturini have led many scholars to erroneously believe that the codex was only painted in black ink.) These colors, derived from natural pigments, would have been widely available to tlacuiloque of the pre-Conquest and early Colonial period, per the Florentine Codex. Those two colors were also of great importance to pre-Conquest tlacuiloque, as noted by period sources.

The lines of red ink connect the date glyphs to the locations the Mexica arrive at. Erasures present in the codex on folios 8 to 11 show that the tlacuilo first tried to connect places and dates by connecting the date of arrival to the location and then to the date of arrival at the next destination. Instead, he used footprints in black ink to carry the Mexica from one destination to the next.

The codex has 24 alphabetical Nahuatl glosses of a faded sepia-colored ink, added after its manufacture. Analyzing and translating the still legible glosses, scholar Patrick Johansson Keraudren found them to be place names or short phrases of a 16th century quality.

=== Manufacture ===
The sheets of amate were glued together sheet-by-sheet on the obverse, with reinforcing strips along the fold-lines on the back. The glue, according to paper scholar Hans Lenz, was made from the roots of Orchidaceae plants and guanacaste sap. Next, the tlacuilo applied a gesso to fill the paper's pores and make the surface more even, but only on the obverse side. (Note: The chemical makeup of the gesso on Codex Boturini is unknown as the codex has, as of 2019, not undergone chemical analysis. Analyses of the pre-Conquest Codex Colombino and post-Conquest Codex Selden suggest that Codex Boturini's gesso is a mixture of calcium sulphate and calcium carbonate.) The tlacuilo then drafted the entirety of the codex in pale black ink, then tied the glyphs and date blocks together with a draft line of red ink. Once the "tlacuilo" had made corrections, the tlacuilo applied a heavy black ink over the drafting black ink, but it is still visible in places. The red draft lines were never painted over. Some of the erasures the tlacuilo made are still evident. Angela Herren Rajagopalan, a scholar of pre-Columbian Mesoamerican art, believes that the tlacuilo worked all at once rather than folio-by-folio.

The red draft ink used in the codex is likely diluted cochineal extract or a clay-based pigment.

== History ==
The date of Boturini Codex's creation is unknown, but the codex had to have been made in the early 16th century AD in the Basin of Mexico. It was assumed by scholars of the 18th and 19th centuries that the codex, because of its style, was pre-Conquest. This began to be contested in the mid-20th century by such scholars as Donald Robertson. He argued that the dating glyphs, grouped and "edited", made it of Colonial make, as pre-Conquest dating glyphs would be in a continuous horizontal stream, like that of the Codex Mexicanus. Historian Pablo Escalante also suggested a post-Colonial manufacture, citing the lack of color and simpleness of the humans in the codex. These choices in style indicate, but do not prove, that the Boturini Codex was produced during or just after the Conquest. Its material and stylistic composition closely match Peter Martyr d'Anghiera's descriptions of the first codices that arrived from the New World.

Scholar Arthur Miller, studying the pre-Conquest Nuttall Codex, described a manufacture very similar to that of the Boturini Codex.

Early European descriptions of the Boturini Codex describe it as being made of agave paper, but later studies found the codex's paper to be amate. Both are pre-Conquest, the latter being common before the establishment of European paper mills.

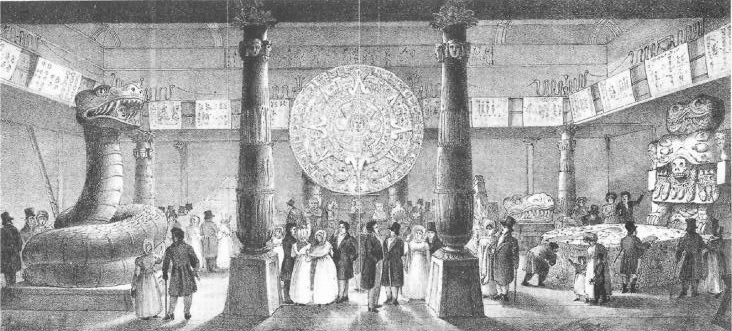
Bullock's exhibition in the Egyptian Hall, on 8 April 1824

The Boturini Codex became part of the library of the eponymous Lorenzo Boturini Benaduci during his time in the Viceroyalty of New Spain, from March 1736 to 31 January 1743. He began cataloging his collection while in prison with a manuscript dated to 15 July 1743, then produced a second by order of the Viceroy later that year. Two more catalogs of Boturini's collections were made by the Viceroyalty in 1745 and Boturini himself the next year, which lists the Boturini Codex as its first item. The codex continued to appear in indexes of Boturini's collection as it moved around Mexico until 1823. William Bullock, an English traveler and collector, took the codex under dubious conditions to London and there included it in an exhibition on Mexico on 8 April 1824. Once the exhibition was closed, Bullock returned the codex to Mexico, though the circumstances of that return are unknown. The codex was much changed at this time; Bullock printed and attached a label to present final folio, and it seems that the final folios were lost between the years 1804 and 1824. (Note: The 1746 and 1804 indexes of the Boturini collection record the Boturini codex as having 23 pages, while Bullock's, in 1824, describes it as having 21. The placement of Bullock's label also indicates that he received it in its damaged condition.) At some point, gold paint was added to the edges of the codex.

Once back in Mexico, the Boturini Codex and the rest of the treasury's collection of antiquities was turned over to the newly-formed National Museum. That institution, now the National Museum of Anthropology, continues to house and display the codex as Manuscript 35-38. In 2015, a digitized version of the codex was made available online by the National Museum.

== Content ==
The codex depicts the events of the Mexica migration from Aztlán and their history from the years 1168 to 1355 AD. It begins with a priest leading Chimalma, fabled ancestor of the Azteca, from Aztlán via a boat. Once they arrive at the shore, near Colhuacan, they build a sheltered altar for their god, Huitzilopochtli, who ordered this migration. There they also encounter eight tribes that desire to accompany the Azteca. (Note: Those eight tribes travelling with the Azteca from Colhuacan are the Huexotzinca, Chalca, Xochimilca, Cuitlihuaca, Malinalca, Chichimeca, Tepaneca, and the Matlatzinca.) The Azteca agree and the nine tribes set out under the leadership of the four god-bearers, Chimalma, Apanecatl, Cuauhcoatl, and Tezcacoatl, each carrying a tlaquimilolli.

Over folios 3 and 4, the Azteca are transformed into the Mexica when Huitzilopochtli chooses them to be his people and teaches them to sacrifice blood to him. He also instigates the split of the Mexica from the other eight tribes as foreshadowed on folio 3 with the broken tree and another image of Huitzilopochtli. Next, five men eat together from one basket, then six men sit together, talking and weeping. Above the six figures, an Aztec (left) carries out Huitzilopochtli's instruction to break from the other eight tribes in a nighttime discussion. On folio 4, the Mexica make their first human sacrifices to Huitzilopochtli, carried by who is Tezcacoatl. The people to be sacrificed are identified as not being Mexica by their animal fur clothes. The figure who broke with the other eight tribes is the executor of the sacrifices. Huitzilopochtli again appears, this time as an eagle, above the victims with a Mexica man to bring him a bow, arrow, bow drill, and woven basket.

The Mexica arrive in the Basin of Mexico at Chapultepec on folio 18, which also depicts the first of the New Fire ceremonies and the invention of the atlatl. After a 20-year stay and celebration of New Fire, the Mexica move on but are attacked and defeated near Acocolco. The victorious warriors bring the Mexica leader Huitzilihuitl and his daughter Chimalaxoch before the tlatoani of Colhuacan, Coxcox. The Mexica make an alliance with Colhuacan and intermarry with its people, thereby securing for themselves prestigious Toltec ancestry. Coxcox tasks the Mexica with battling the Xochimilco and to return with the ears of slain opponents as proof of the killing. Here the codex ends, just before the founding of Tenochtitlan. Indexes by the government of New Spain elucidate that folios lost in the early 19th century documented the wars of the Mexica around Chapultepec fought on Coxcox's behalf.

The invention of pulque is displayed on folio 13.

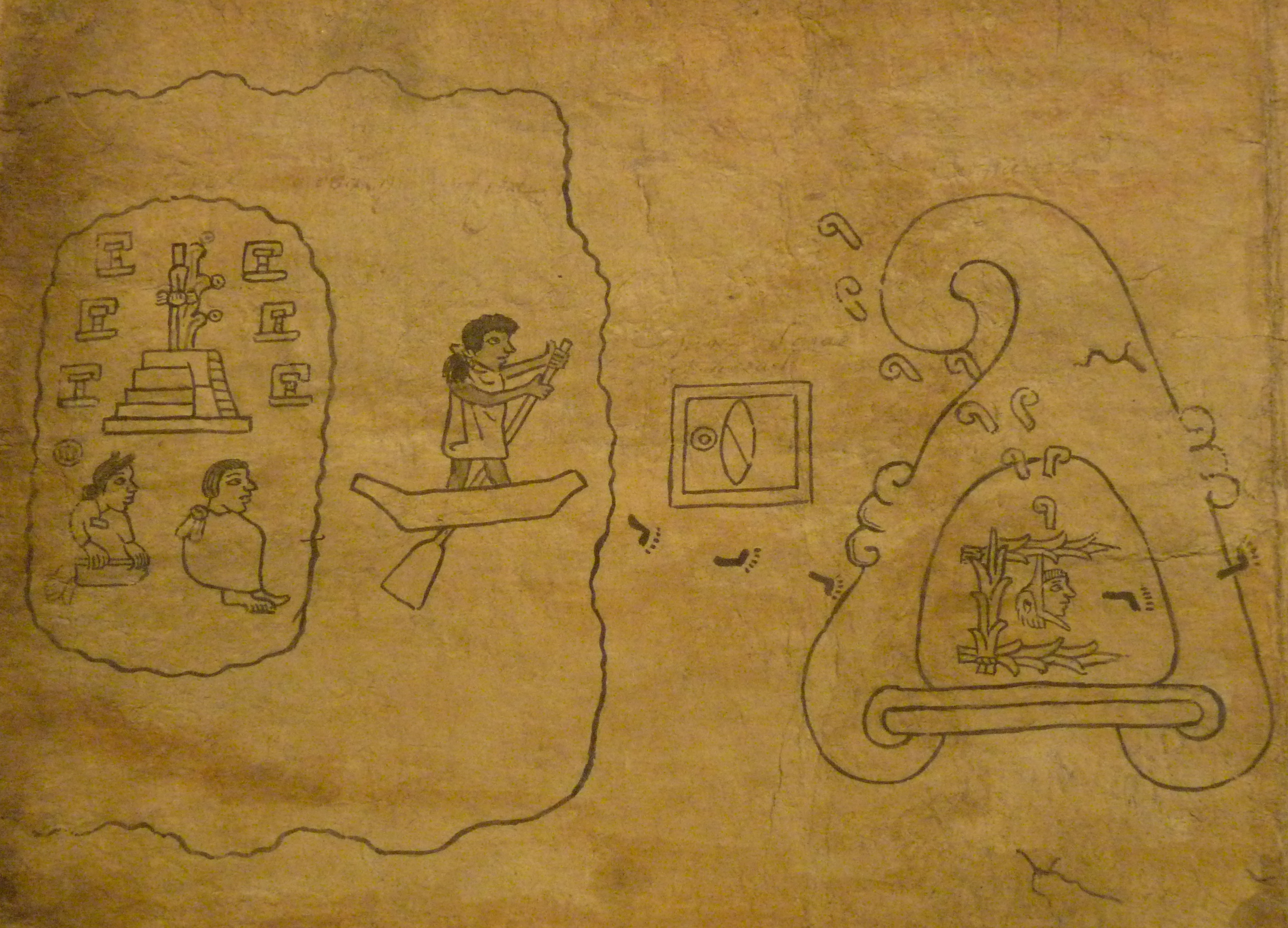
Folio 1. The Colhuacan glyph, on the right, has an uncovered draft line on its left side.

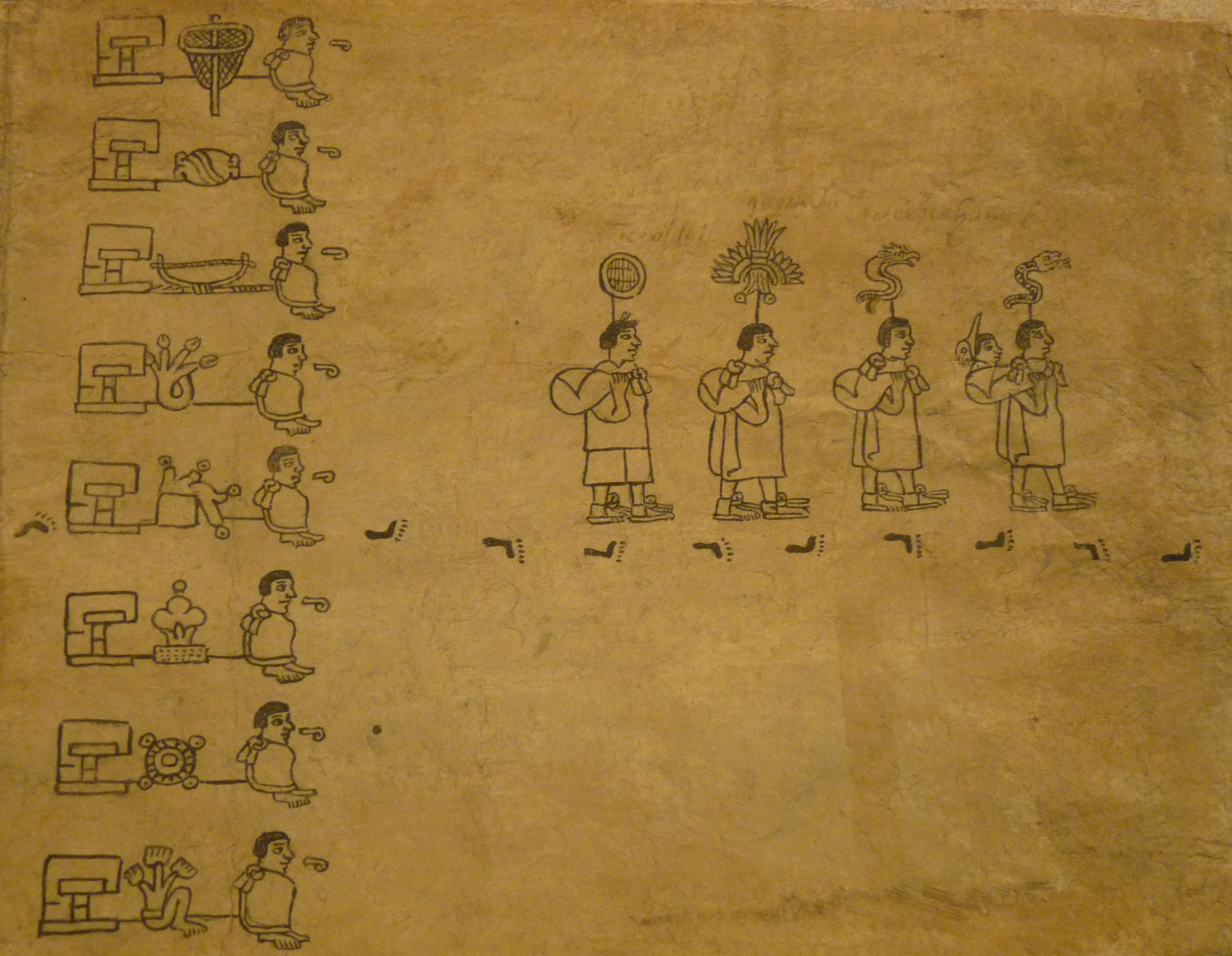
Folio 2

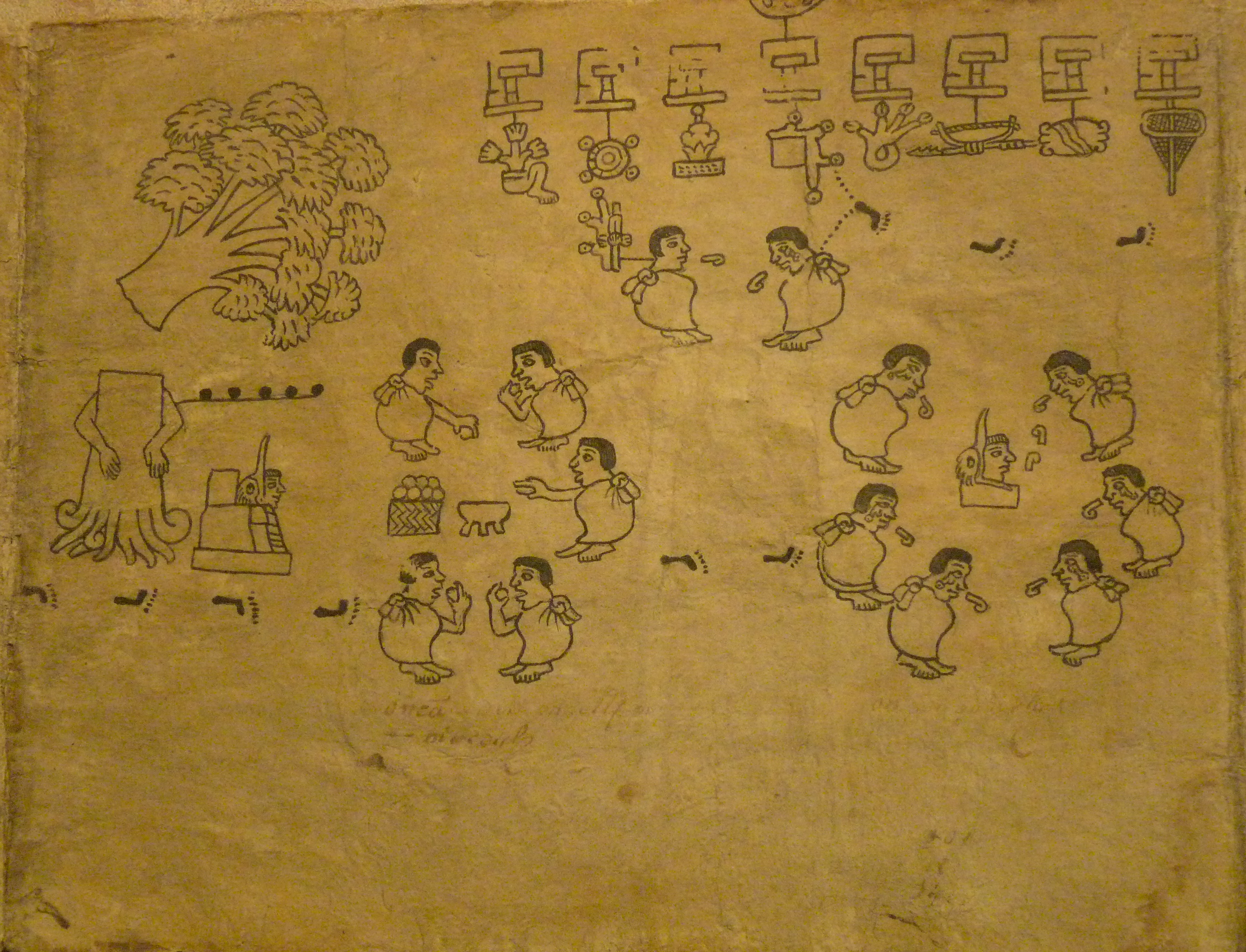
Folio 3

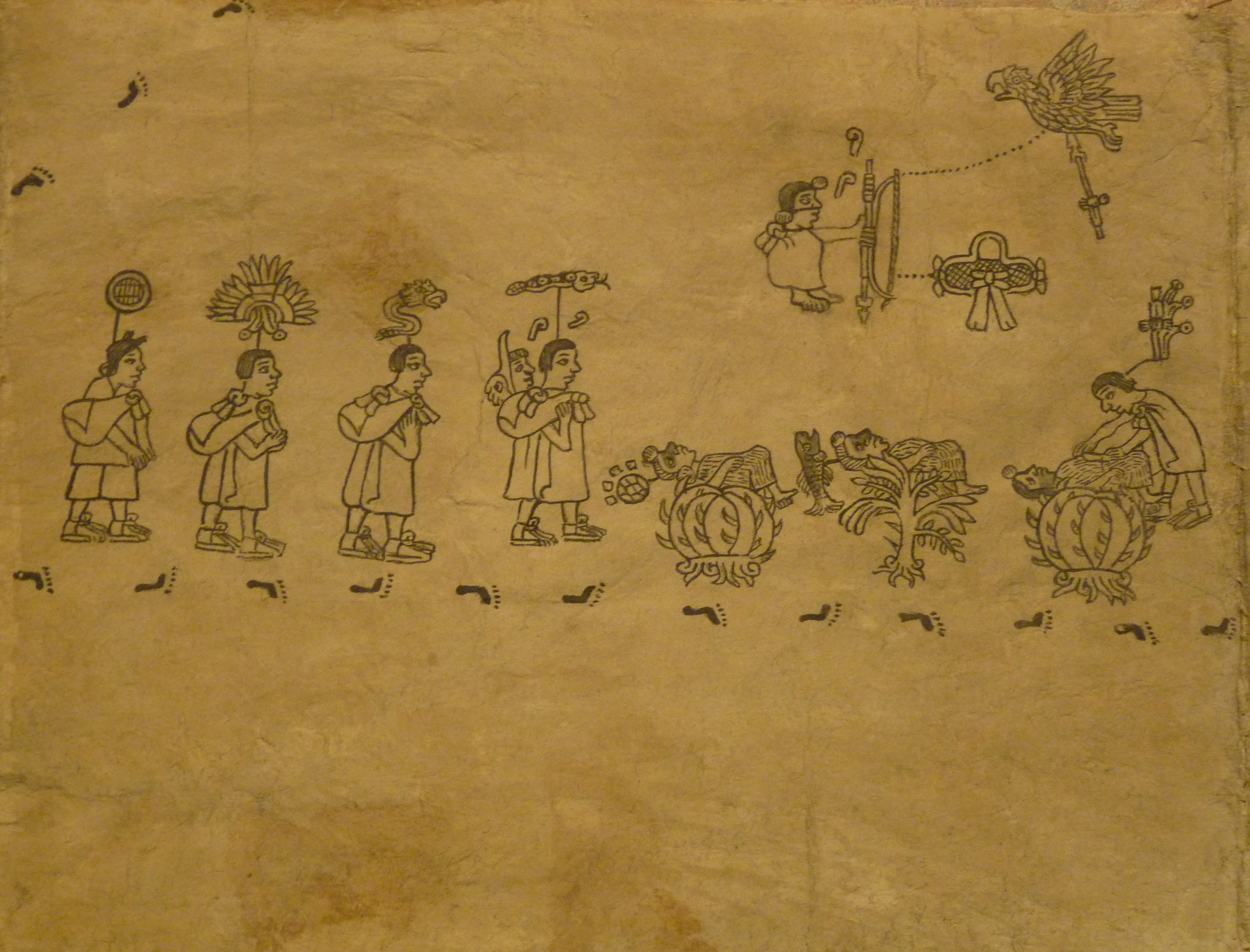
Folio 4

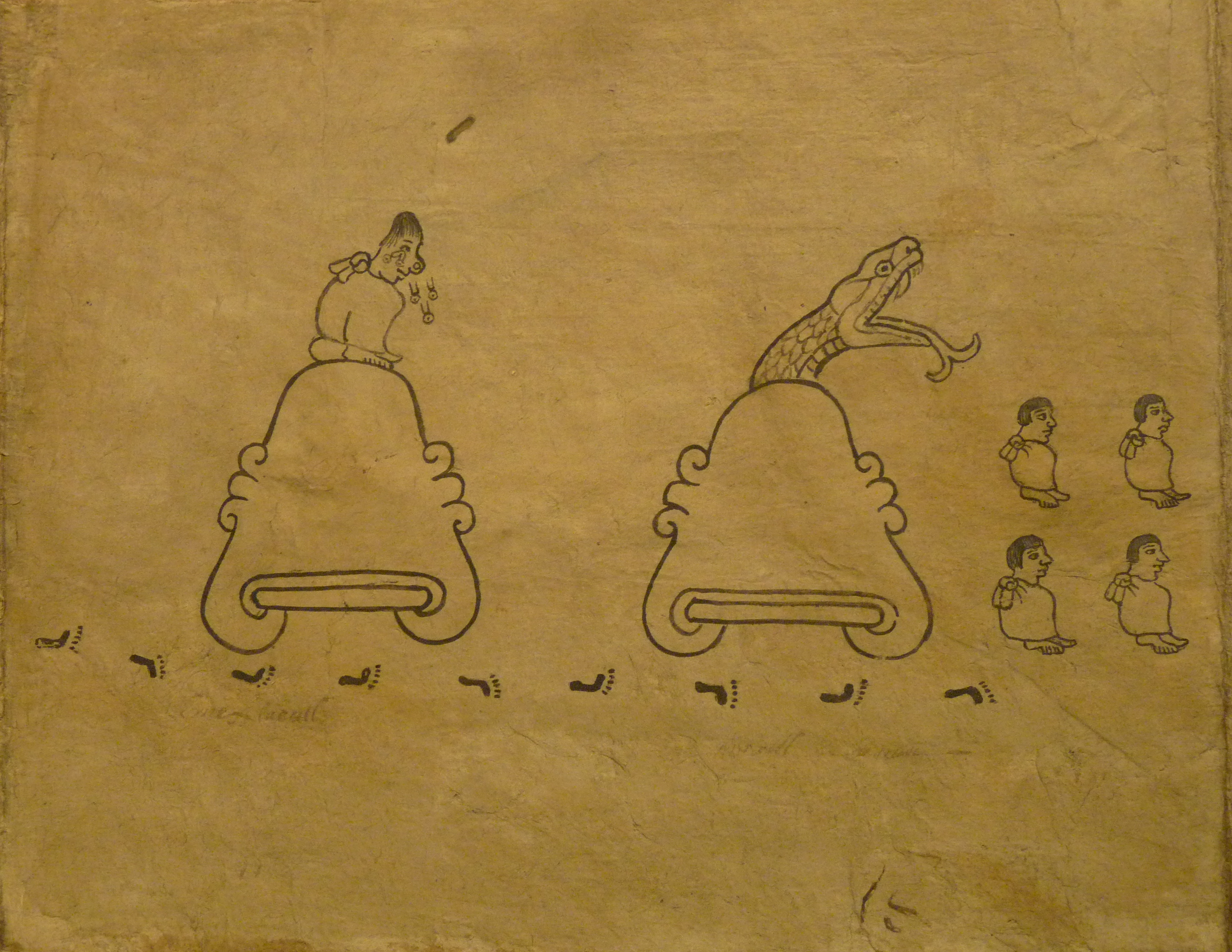
Folio 5. At the bottom portion of the glyph for Coatlicamac is a draft line running from the glyph's left to its right.

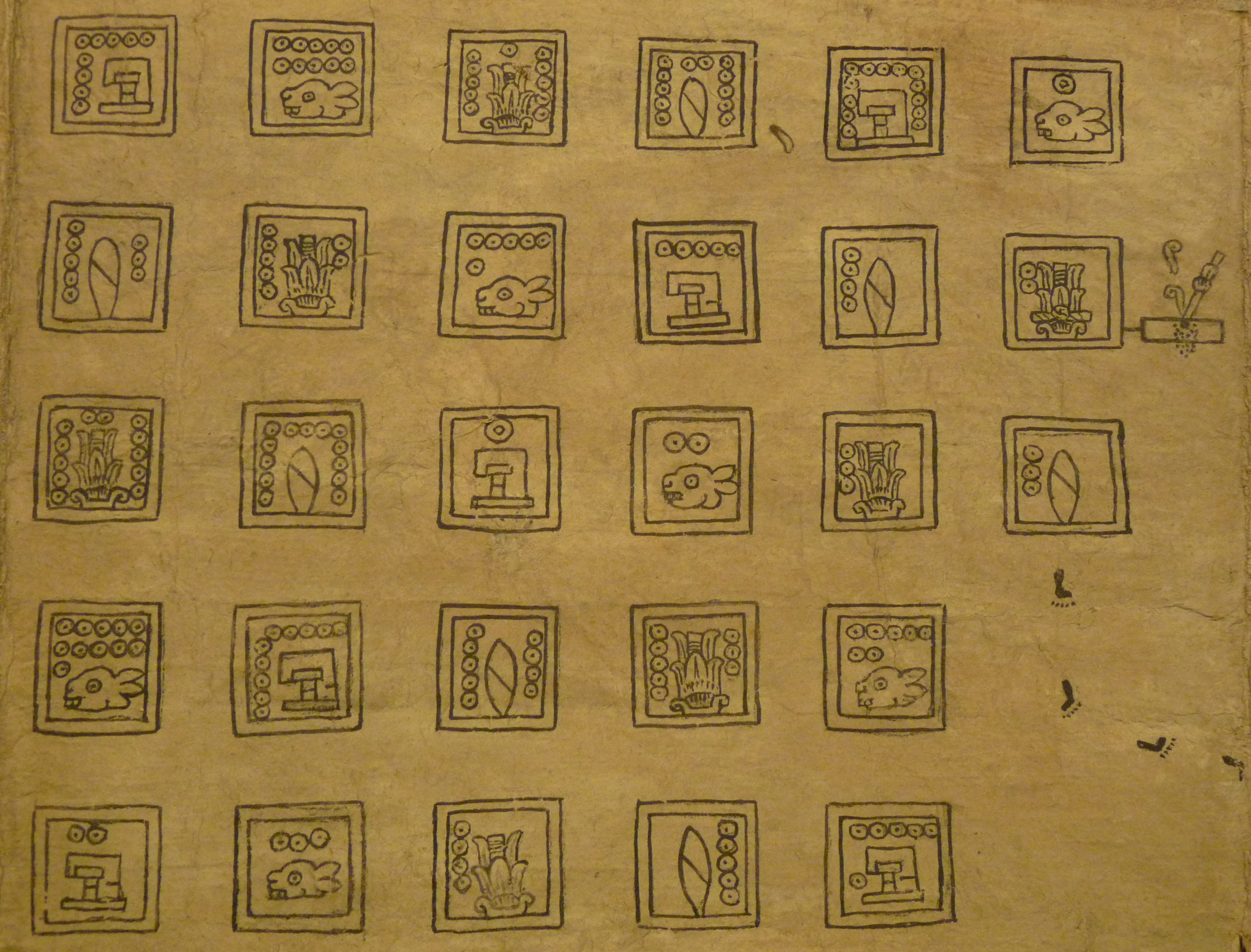
Folio 6

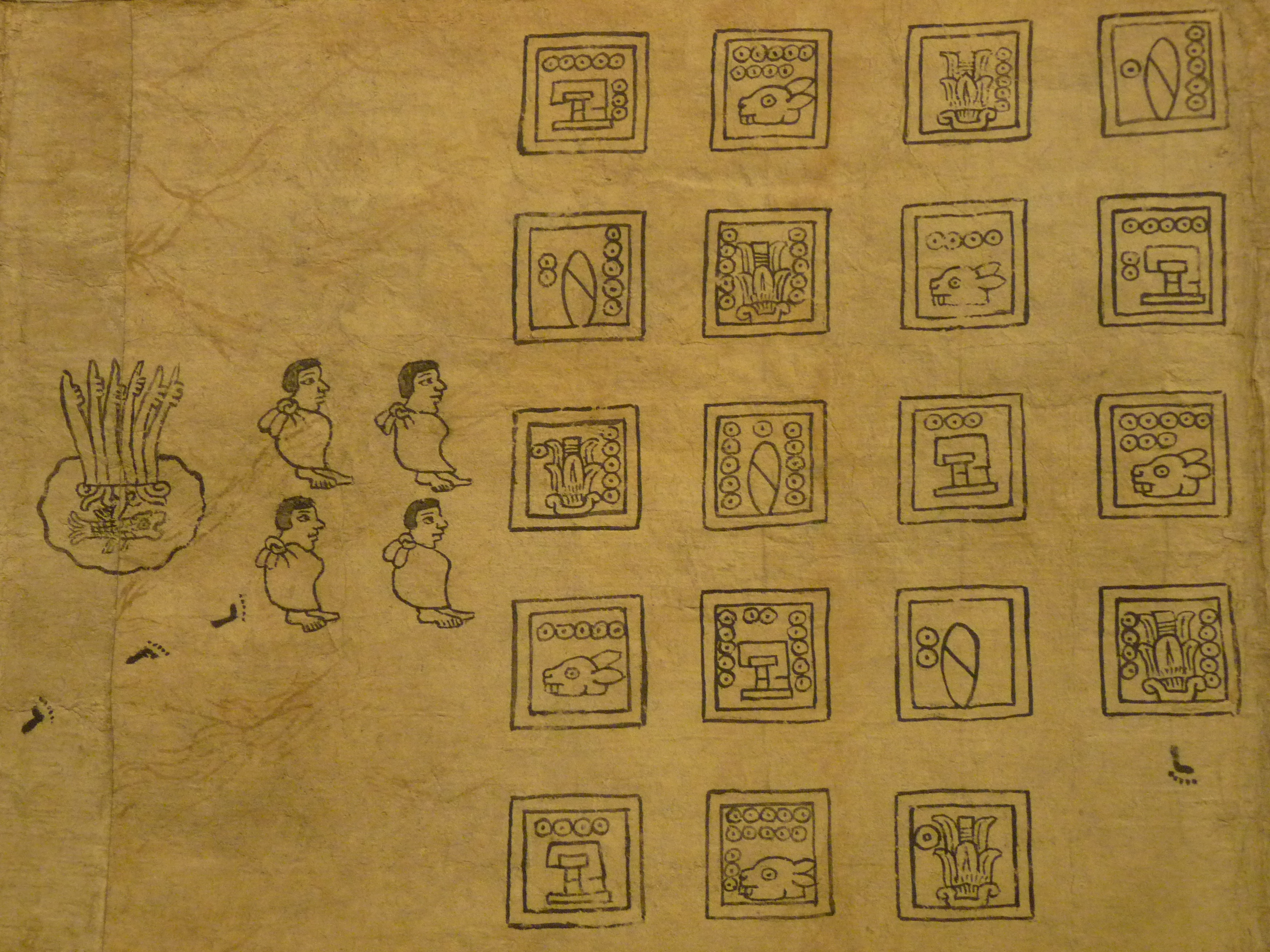
Folio 7

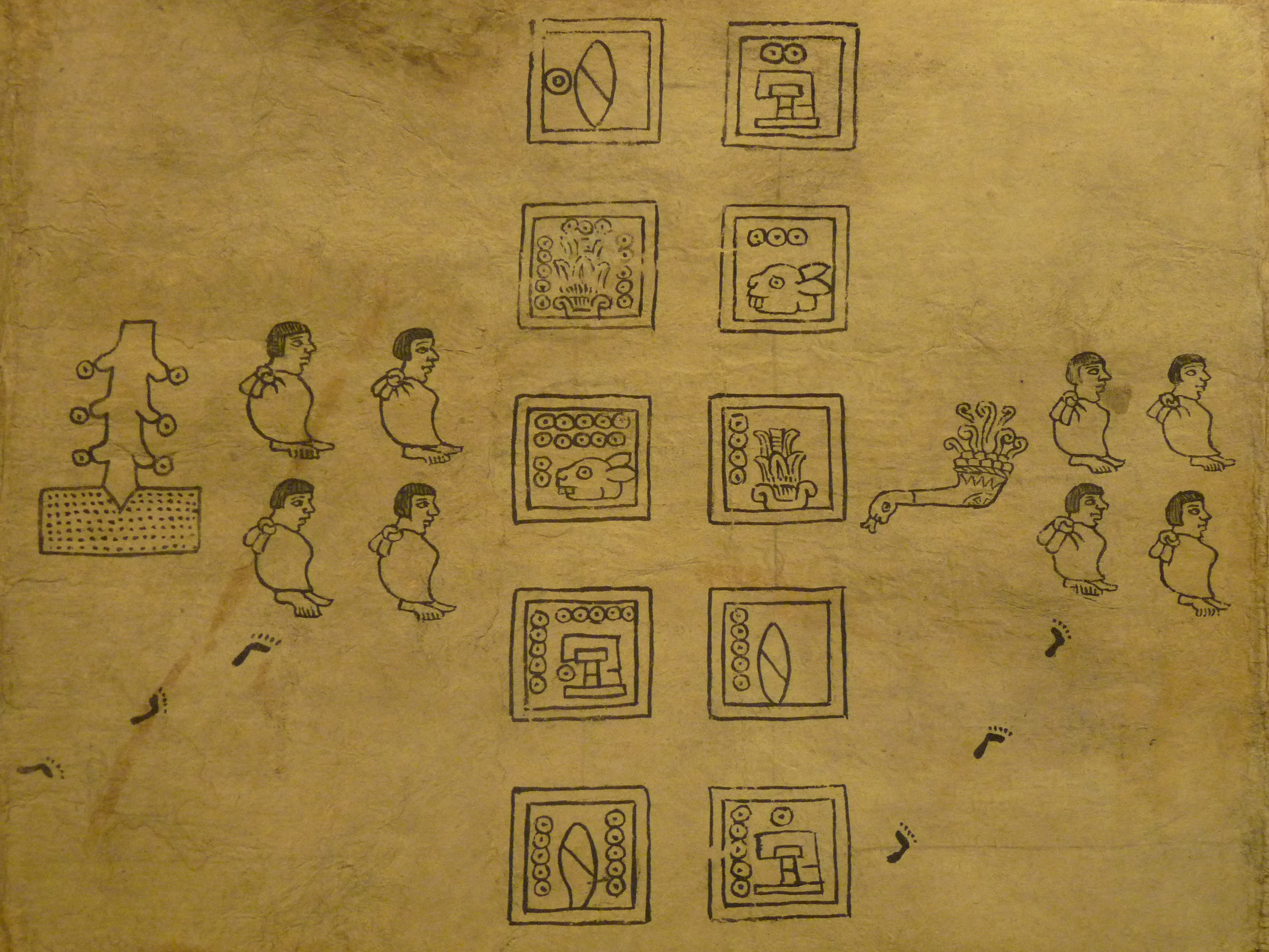
Folio 8. The second glyph from the top in the left-side column is an example of excessive erasure by the tlacuilo.

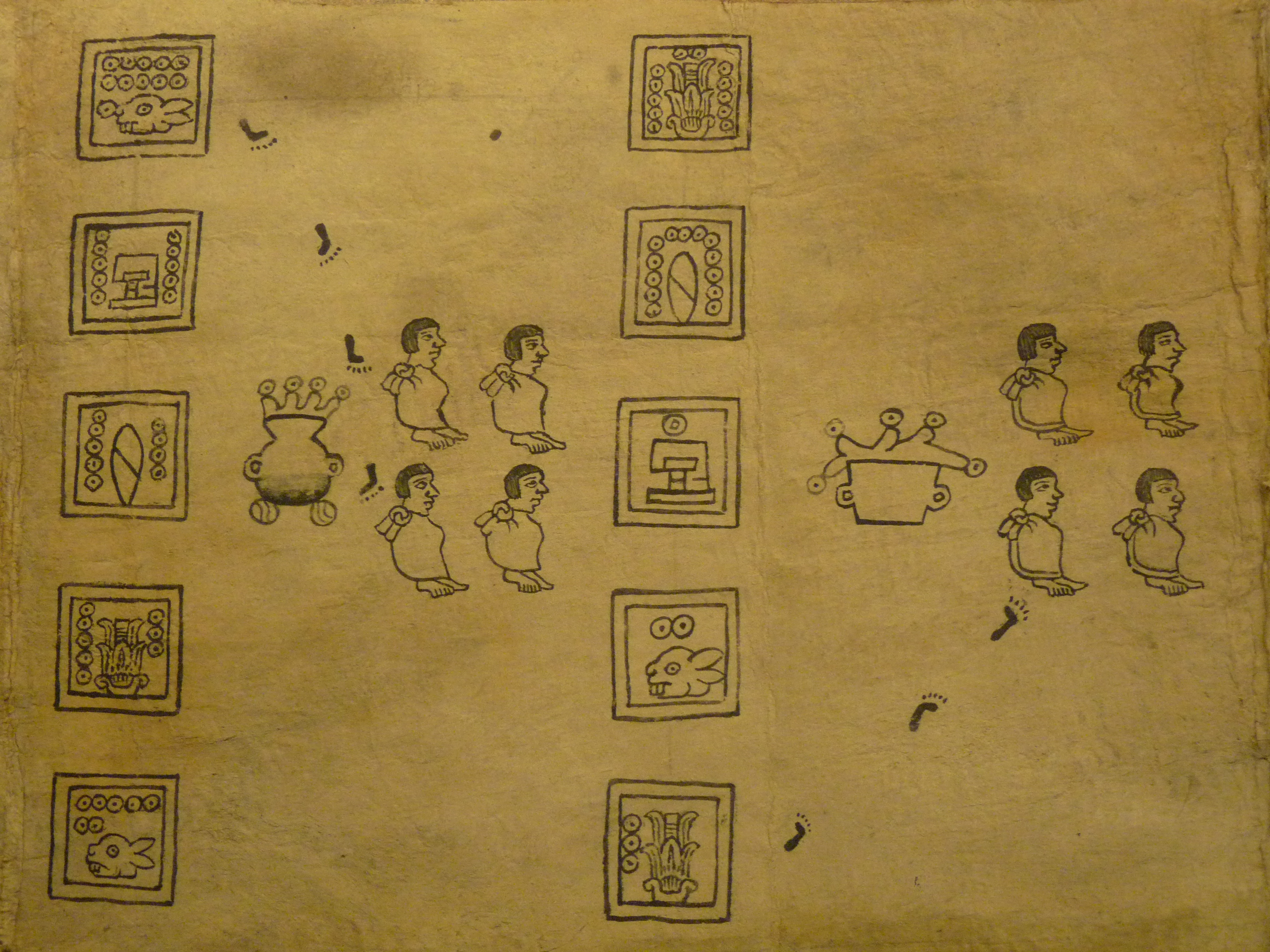
Folio 9. Beneath and below the glyph for Apaxco are the ghostly remains of two more date glyphs.

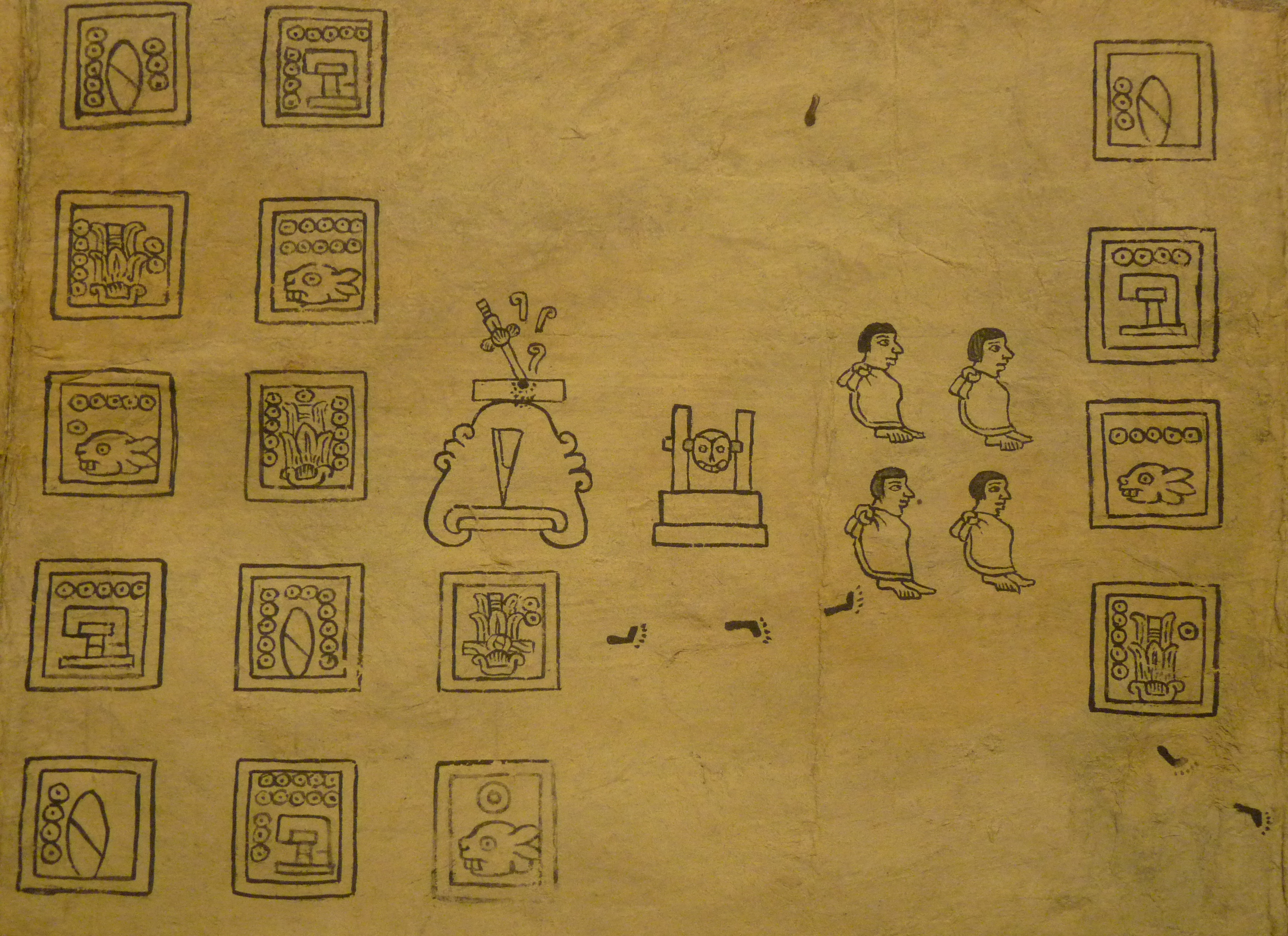
Folio 10. The tlacuilo has here erased a red draft line from 3 Flint to the glyph for Tzompanco.

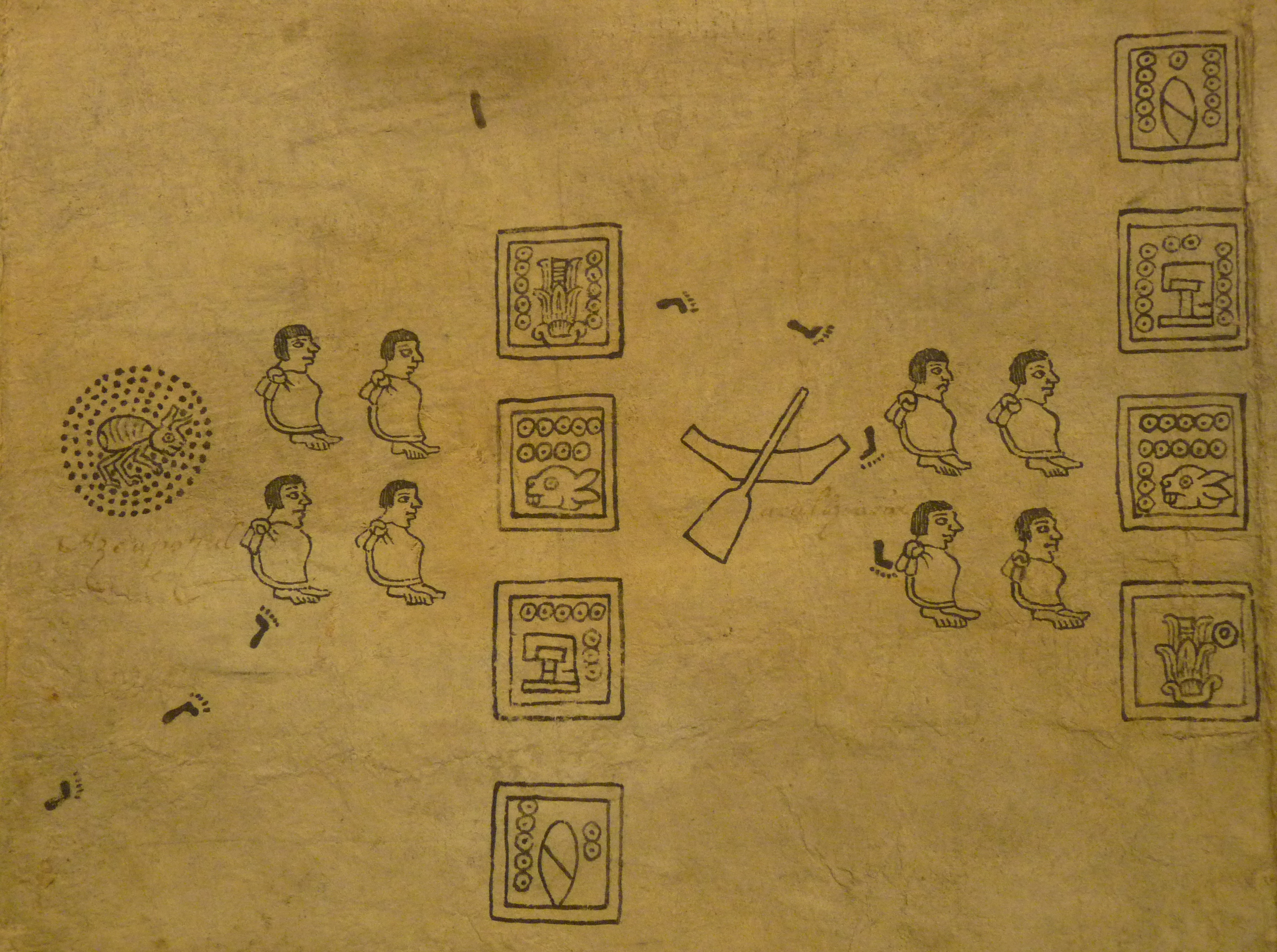
Folio 11

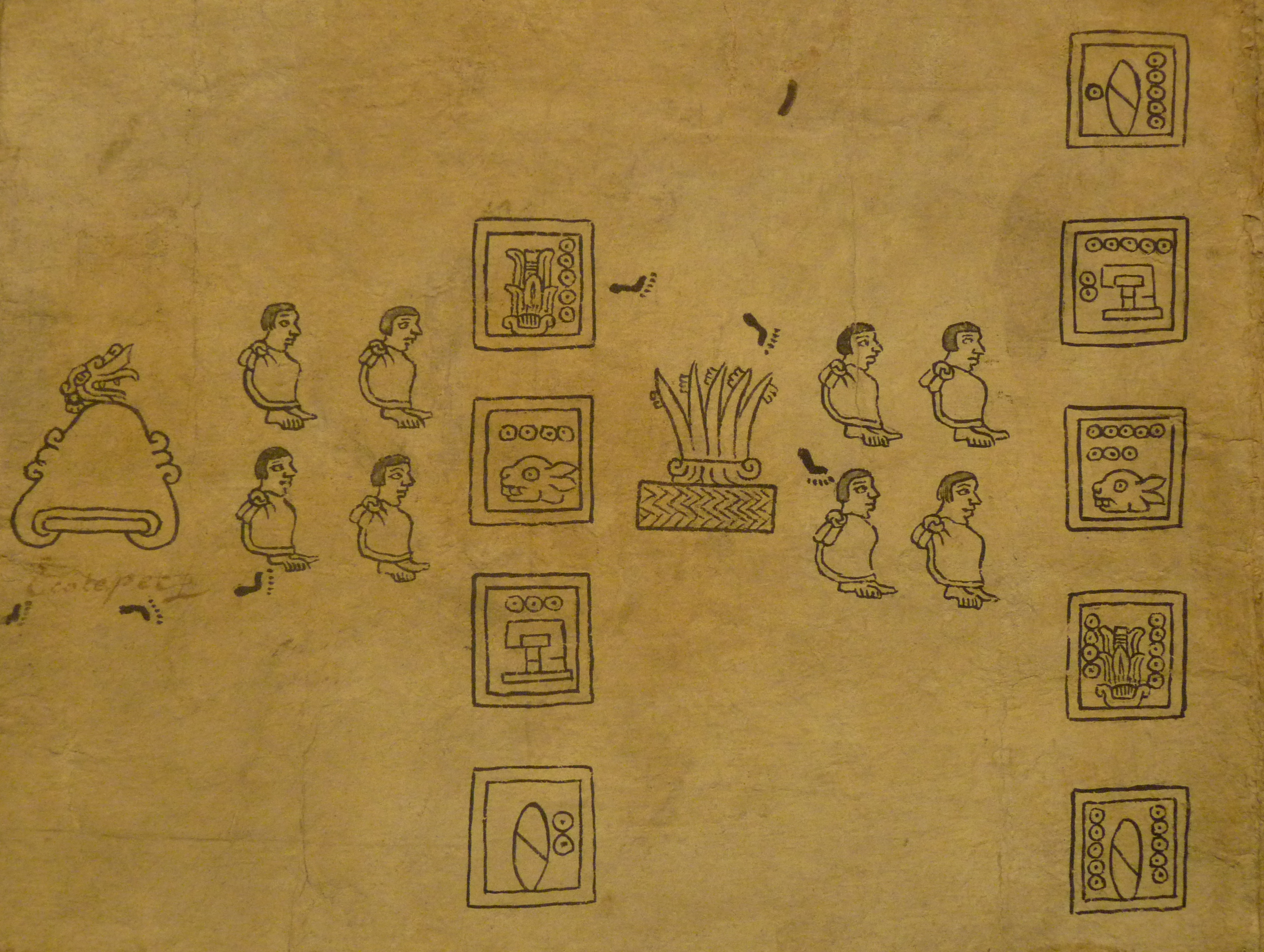
Folio 12

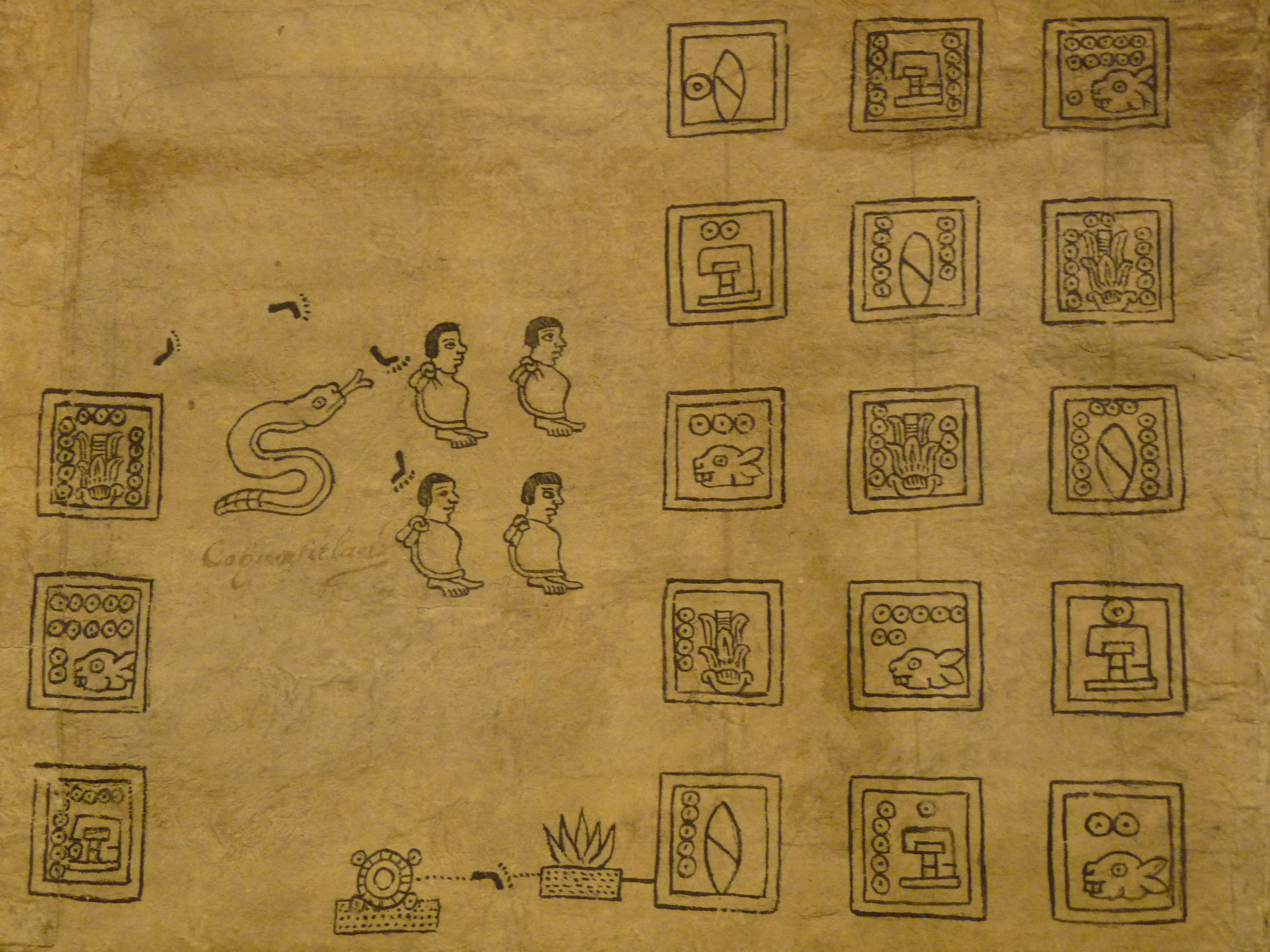
Folio 13

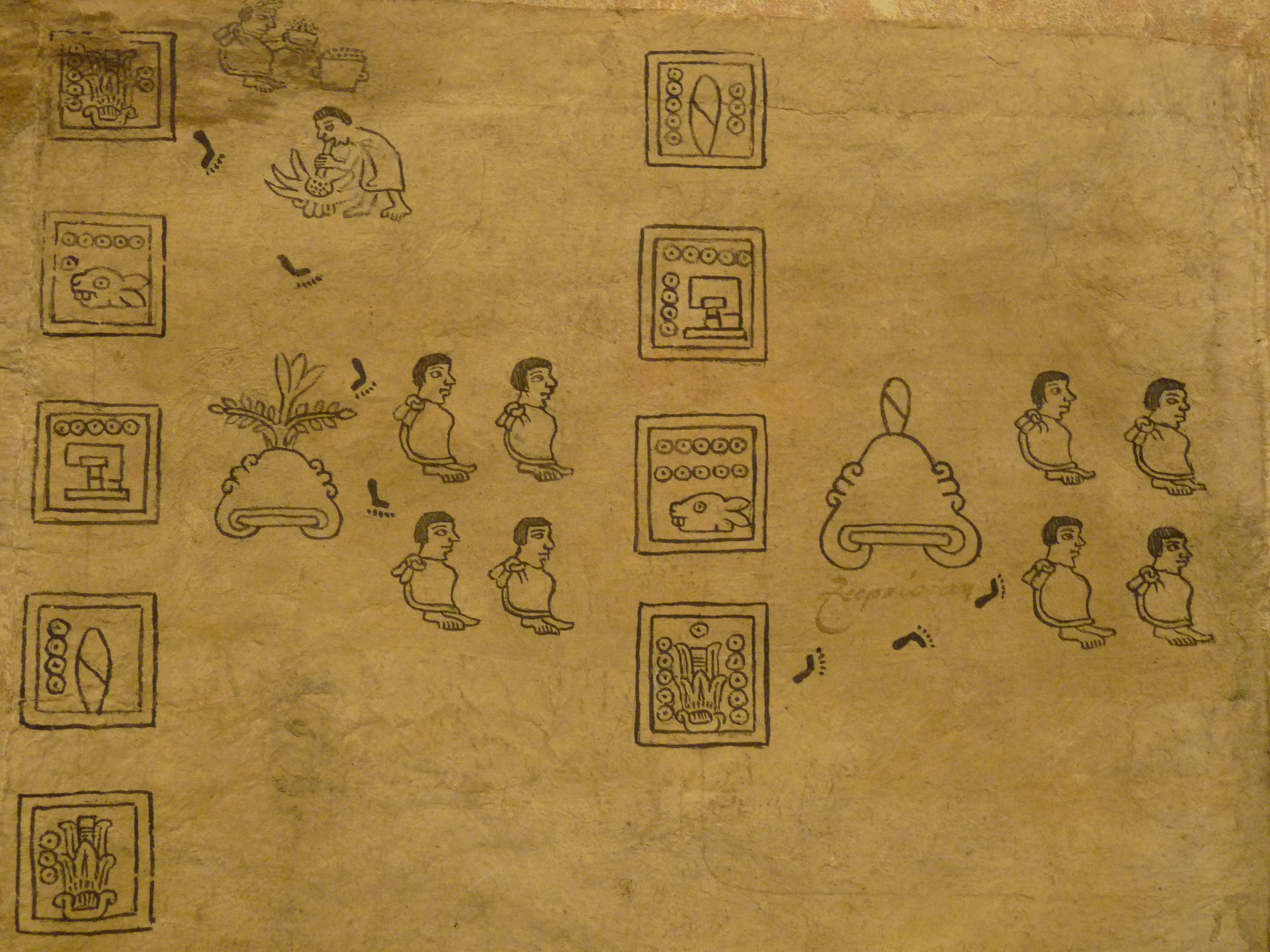
Folio 14

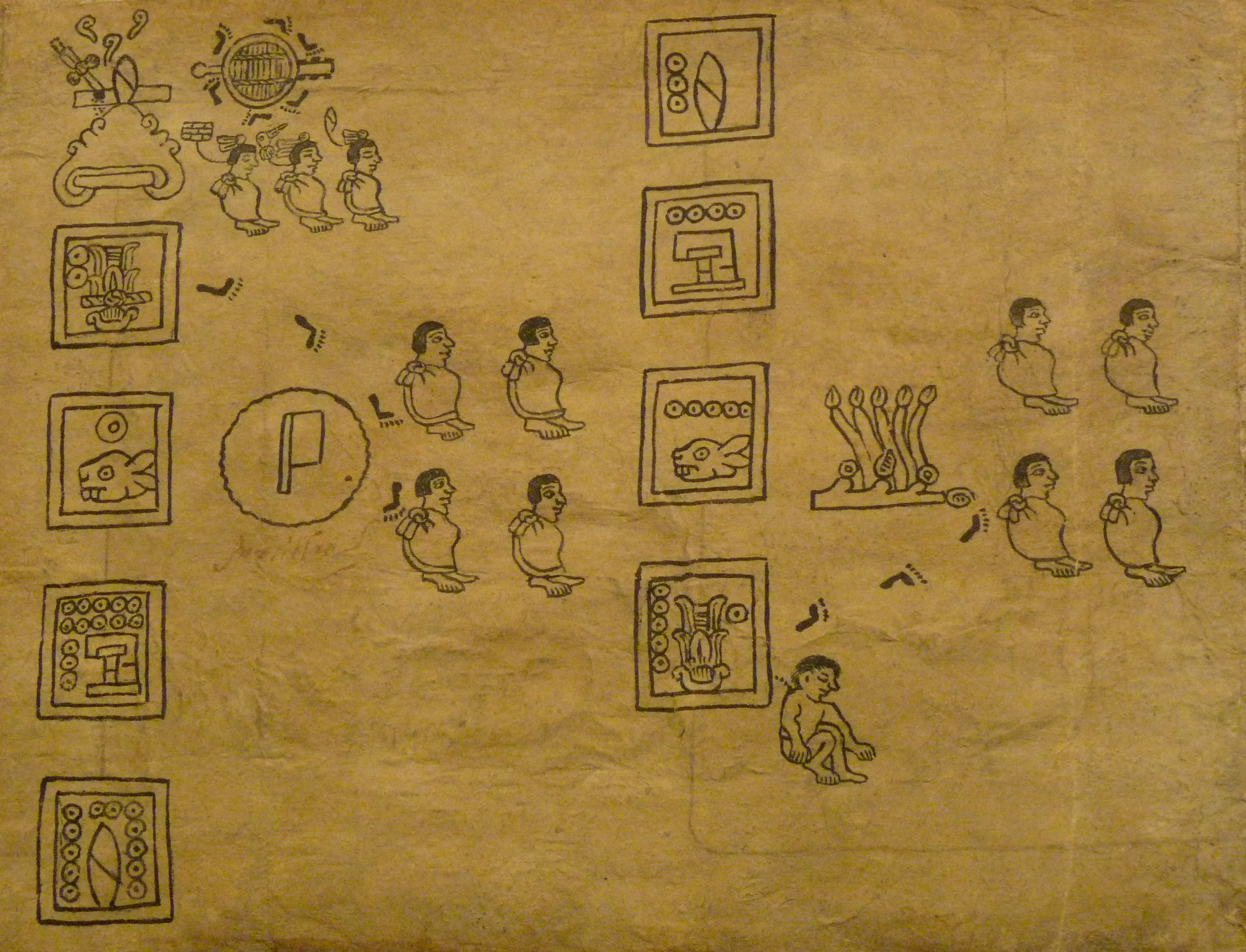
Folio 15

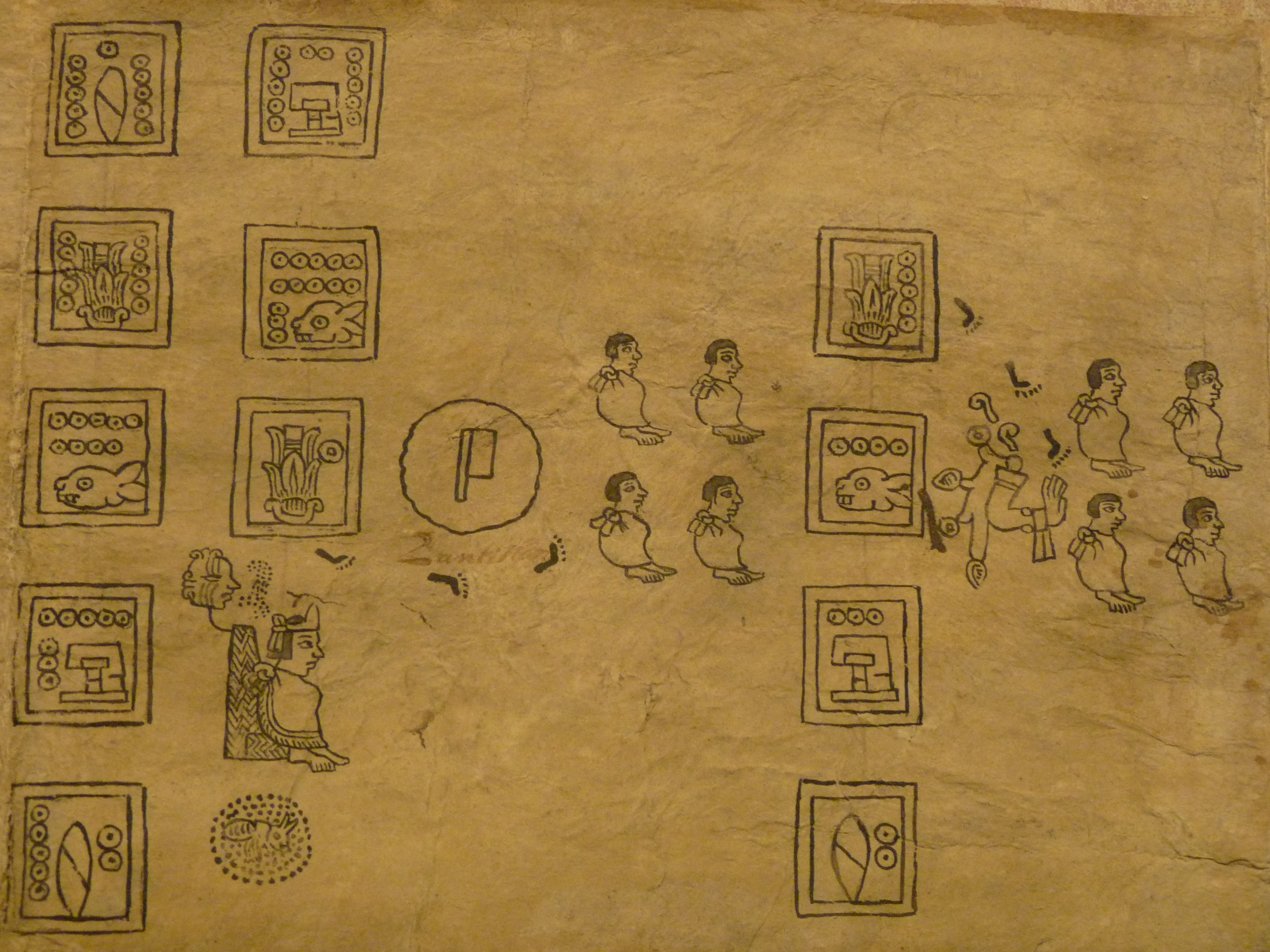
Folio 16. The ant glyph in the bottom left corner is another example of excessive erasure by the tlacuilo.

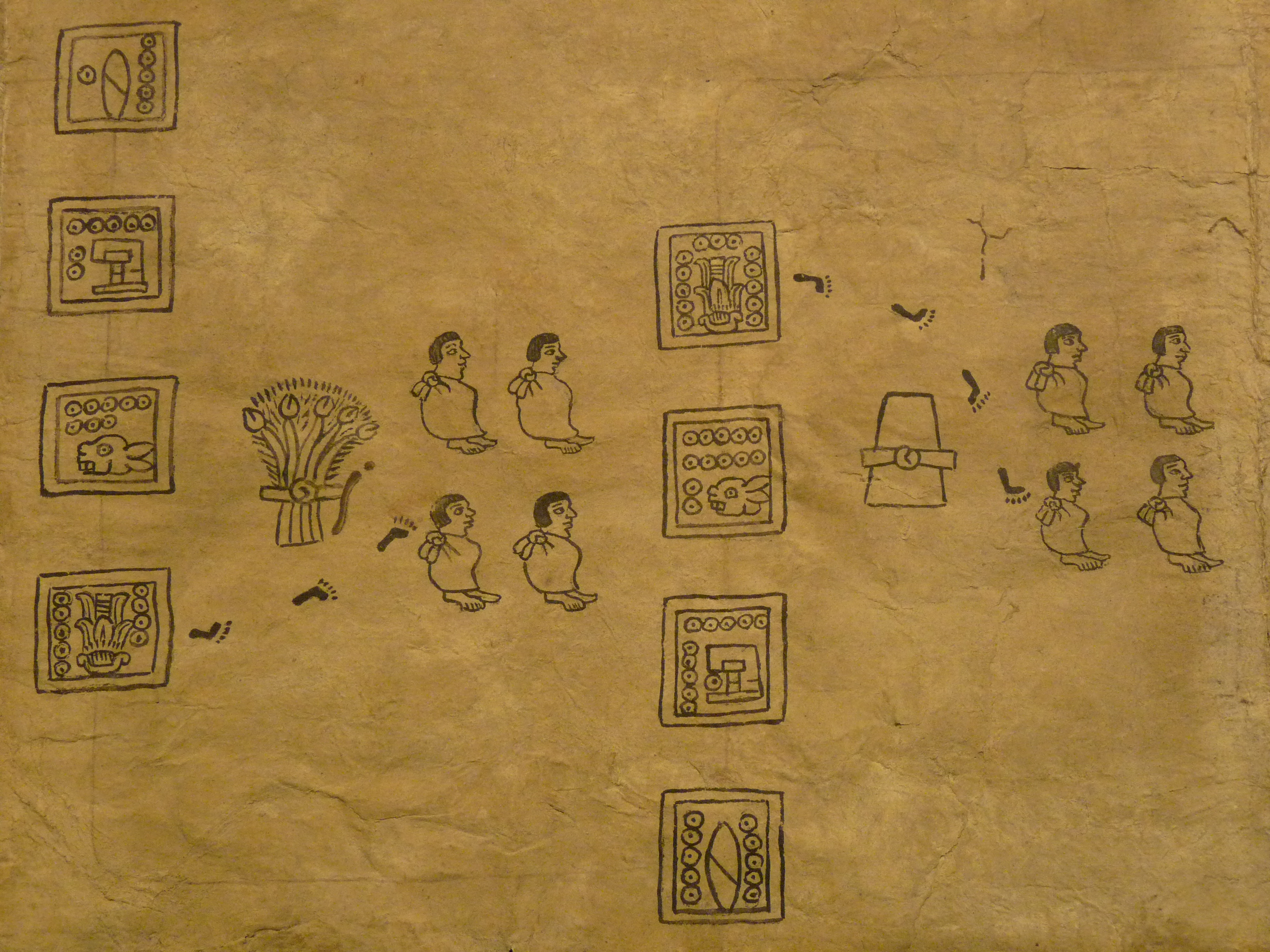
Folio 17

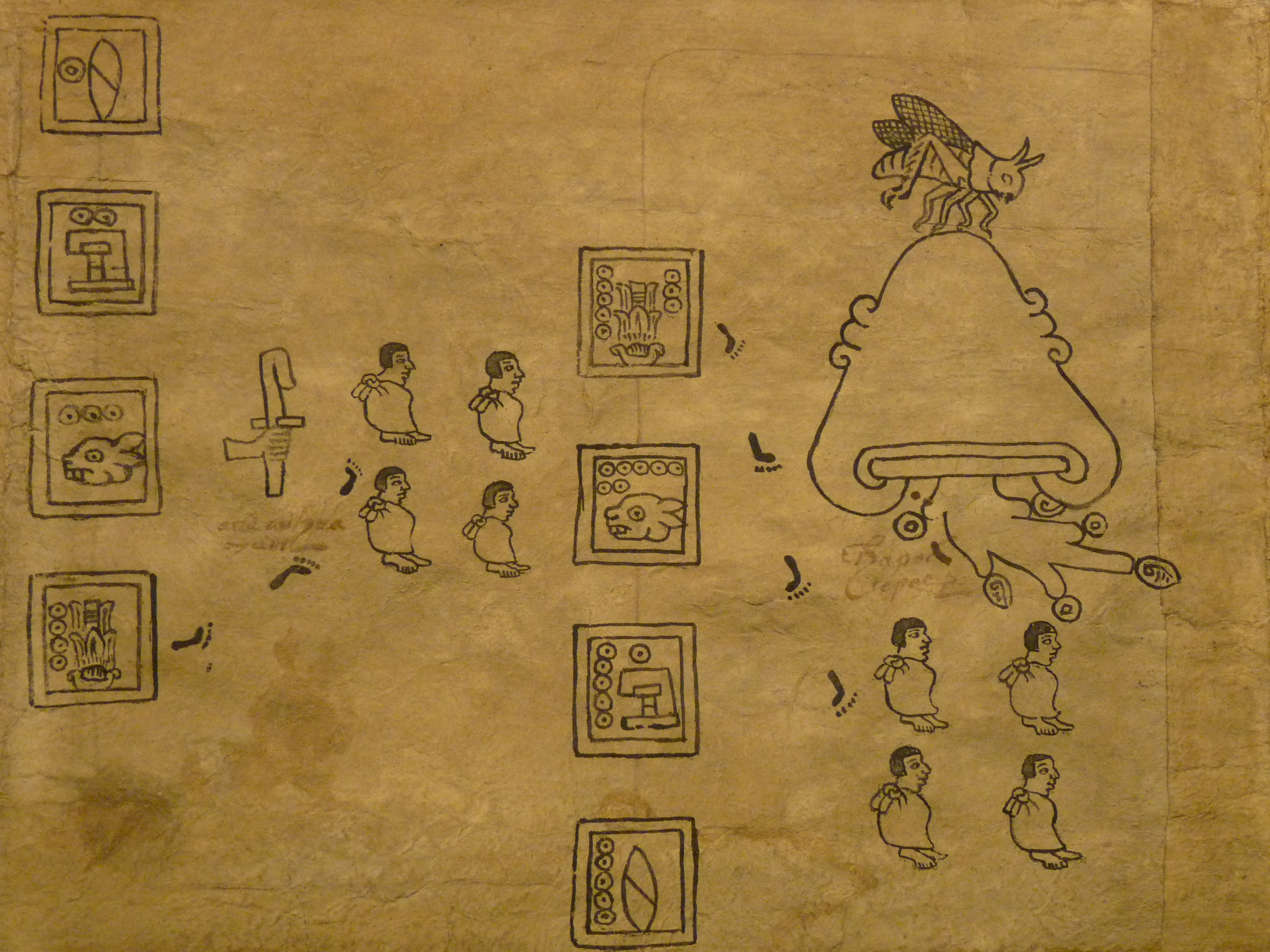
Folio 18

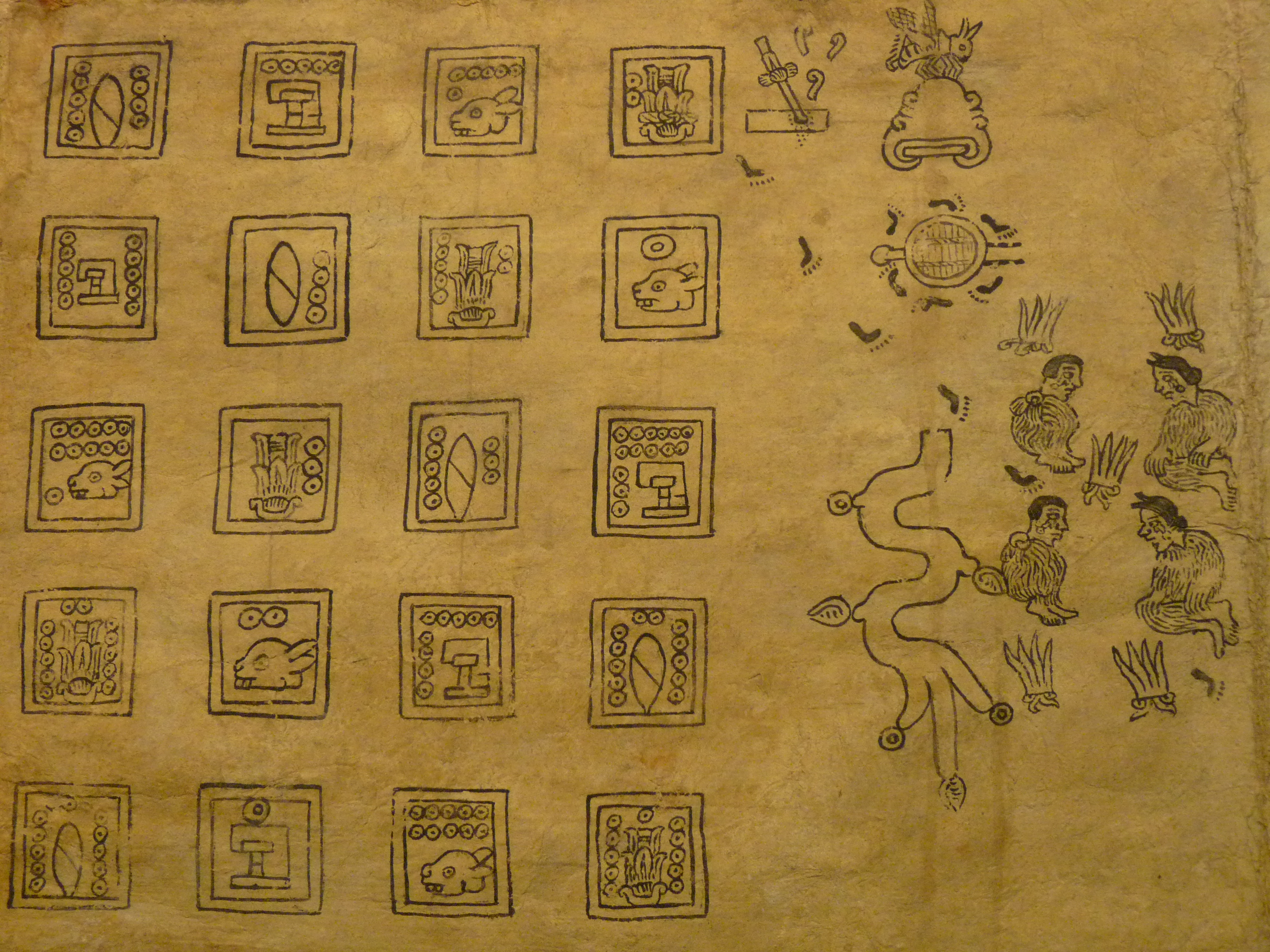
Folio 19

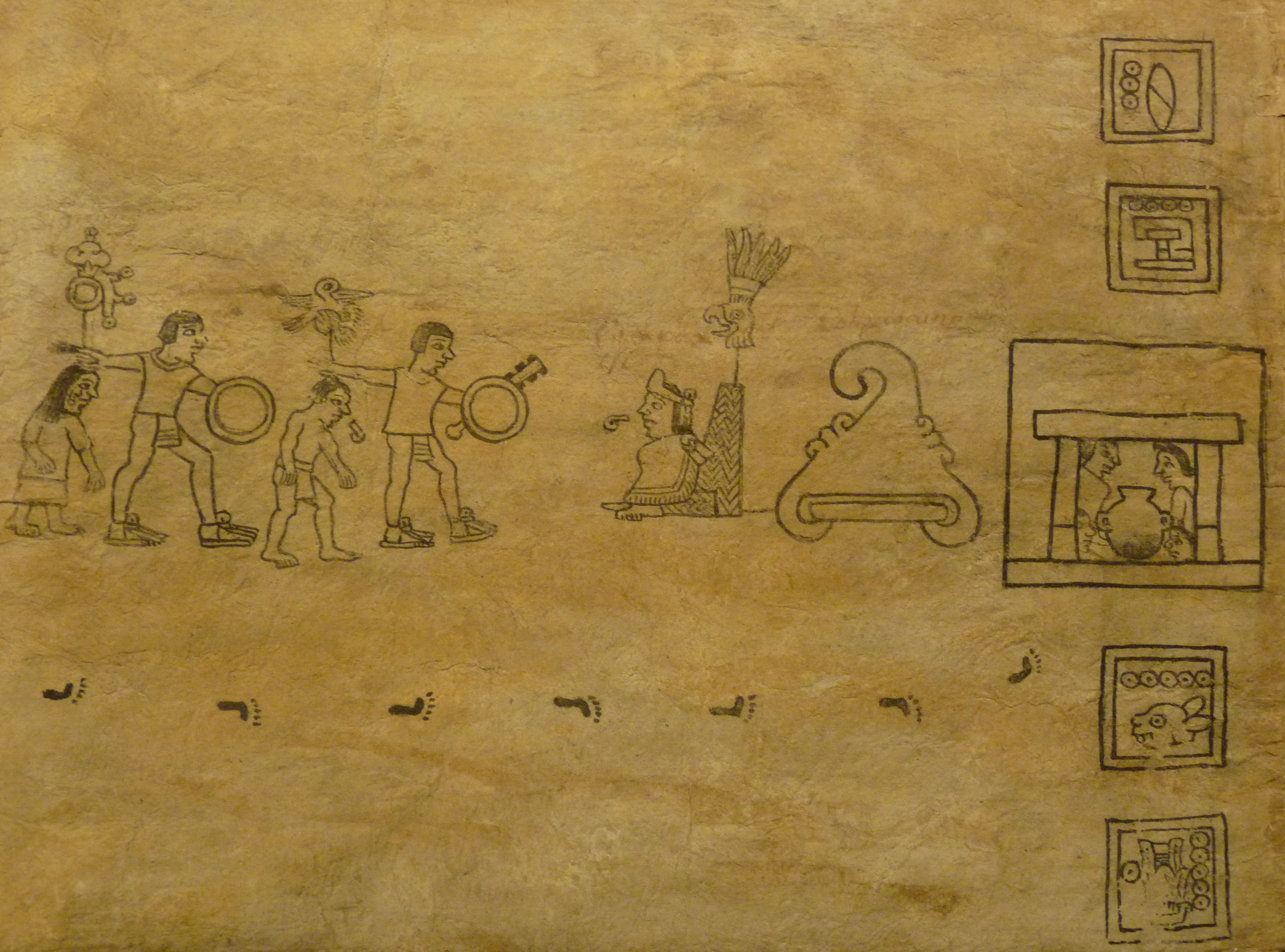
Folio 20

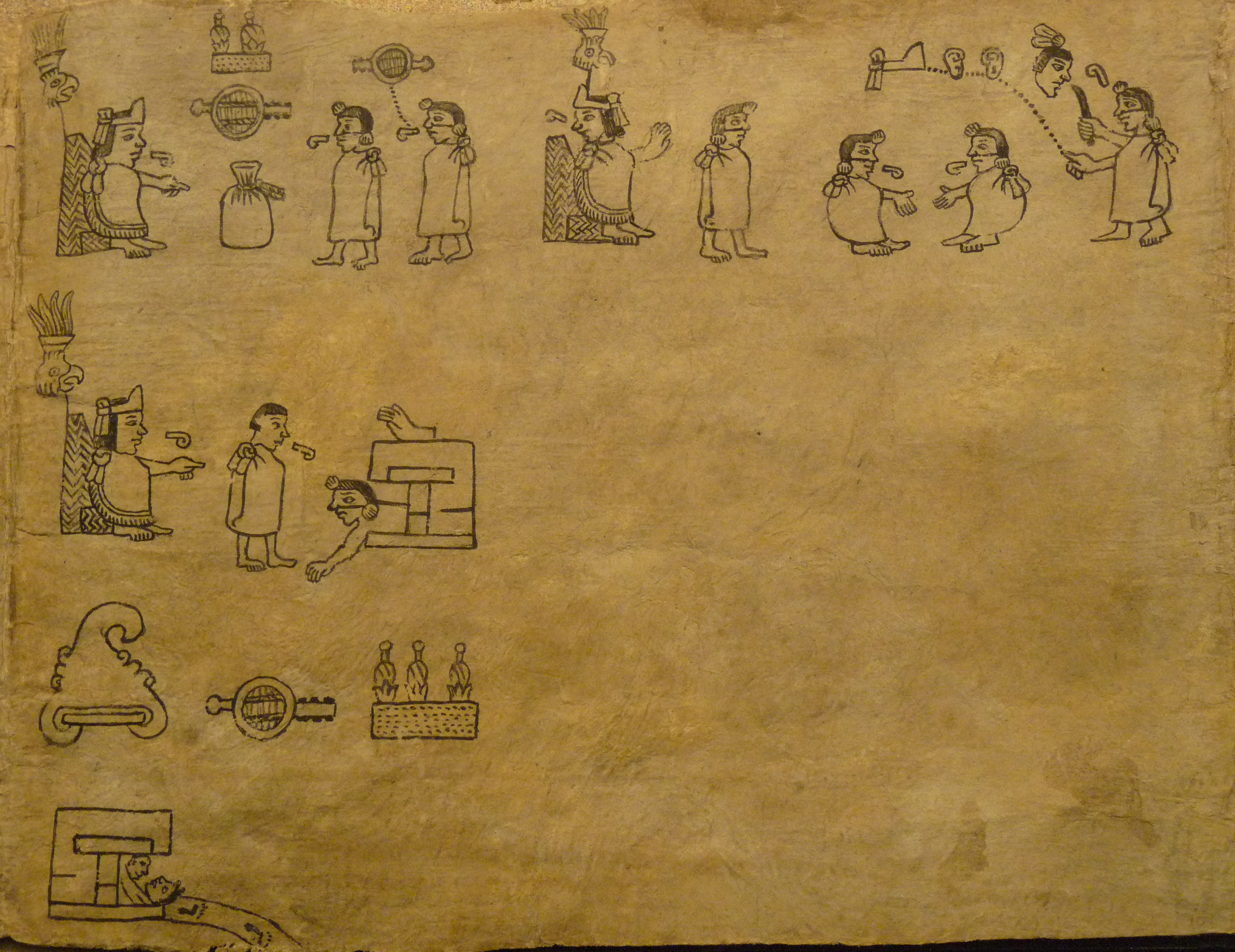
Folio 21

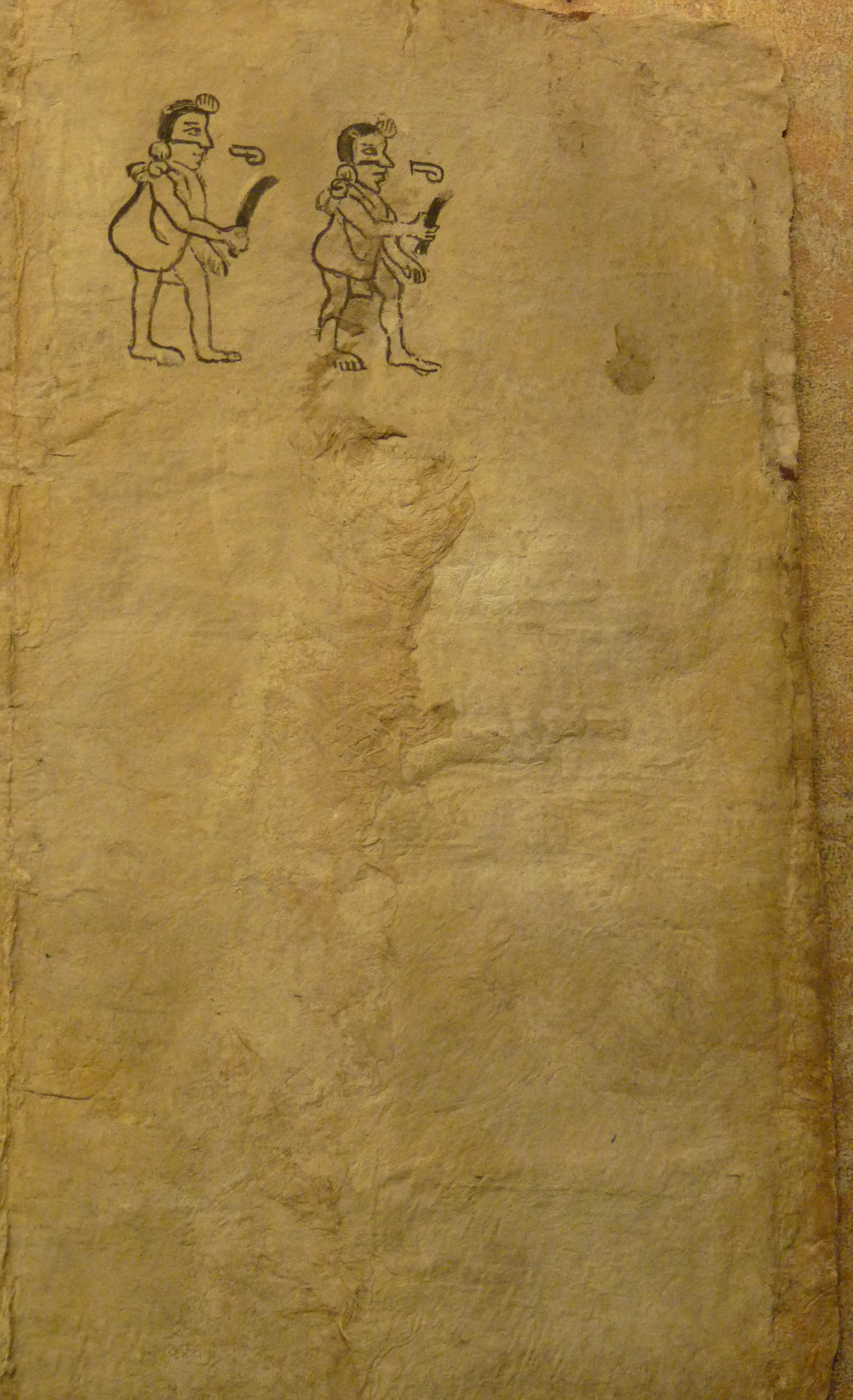
Folio 22

=== Similarity to other codices ===
The content of the Boturini Codex has much in common with the later Aubin Codex, which records nearly the exact itinerary as the Boturini Codex. The exception are discrepancies in dates for the first six sites of the migration, and at the end of the Aubin Codex. The latter codex emphasizes dates of arrival rather than of departure. The Aubin Codex also does not, in the depiction of the first sacrifice to Huitzilopochtli, have the victims appear differently to the Mexica.

Codex Mexicanus, a palimpsest manuscript, also has strong resemblances to the Boturini Codex. The footprints are reproduced, as are the red lines linking date glyphs, and dates of departure are emphasized, as in Codex Boturini. The tlacuiloque only used black ink for the footprints.

== See also ==
- Aztec codices
- Codex Aubin
- Lorenzo Boturini Benaduci
