= Sariah =

Wife of the Book of Mormon Prophet Lehi

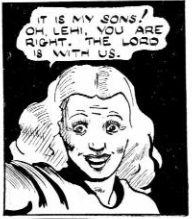
Sariah comforted by her sons' return (1948). Comic by John Philip Dalby.

According to the Book of Mormon, Sariah (/səˈraɪə/) was the wife of Lehi, and the mother of Laman, Lemuel, Sam, and Nephi. She traveled with her husband from Jerusalem, into the wilderness, and eventually, across the ocean to the "promised land" (the Americas). She is noted for the story in First Nephi where she complains to Lehi for sending her sons back to Jerusalem thinking that they may have died. Once they return, Sariah testifies that her husband is truly a prophet. In Lehi's vision of the tree of life, Sariah chooses to eat the fruit representing God's love. She has two more sons, Jacob and Joseph, while traveling in the wilderness and almost dies of grief while crossing the ocean when Laman and Lemuel try to kill Nephi.

Scholars point out that Sariah helps prove Nephi's thesis that the faithful will become strong and will receive the mercy of the Lord as she receives a personal testimony after waiting for her sons to return from Jerusalem. Others suggest that Sariah would have managed the family travels, including tent set up and take down, food gathering, material weaving, and more. Additionally, it is proposed that the name Sariah in Hebrew means "Jehovah is Prince" or "Princess of Jehovah".

== Narration ==
Sariah is part of the first family mentioned in the Book of Mormon and is also the only woman named in Nephi's records. Around 600 BC, her husband, Lehi, is told by the Spirit to prophesy the destruction of Jerusalem if the citizens refuse to repent. Lehi's prophecies are rejected, and he is told to take his family out of Jerusalem and travel into the desert. Sariah, Lehi, and their four sons pack up what they need and leave their riches behind, ending up in a place they name the valley of Lemuel. After a period of time in the valley, Laman, Lemuel, Sam, and Nephi are sent back home to retrieve the brass plates.

As Sariah waits for her sons to return, she begins to worry that they have died in the wilderness and complains to Lehi for sending them back to the dangers of Jerusalem. Her husband comforts her, but she continues to worry until her sons return, when she testifies that Lehi truly is a prophet. This belief is shown again later when Lehi dreams of the tree of life and calls his family to come and eat the fruit, which represents God's love. Sariah, Sam, and Nephi come and eat while Laman and Lemuel choose other paths.

While traveling in the wilderness, Sariah has another two sons named Jacob and Joseph. Later, while crossing the ocean, Laman and Lemuel try to kill Nephi, causing Sariah and Lehi so much grief that they become sick and almost die. Sariah's actual death is not specifically mentioned in the Book of Mormon.

== Interpretation ==
=== Nephi's thesis ===
Nephi claims at the beginning of his writings that those who are faithful will become "mighty" and the mercies of the Lord will be extended to them. According to Noel B. Reynolds, director of the Foundation for Ancient Research and Mormon studies, this statement of Nephi's in 1 Nephi 1:20 is a thesis that he supports about thirty times with different events in his writings. These events include quoting prophecies from the brass plates that talk about the faithful delivered through the power of the Atonement and the angel saving Nephi and Sam from being beaten by their brothers. As Reynolds states it, Sariah's faith is contrasted against Laman and Lemuel's as she no longer needed to be persuaded to be faithful after her sons came back from Jerusalem, but Laman and Lemuel need to be reminded multiple times of their faith.

=== Role in desert travel ===
Anthropologist and Book of Mormon researcher Brant A. Gardner says as the wife of a wealthy man in Jerusalem, Sariah would have been used to running a household and would have had the responsibility of managing the family while they traveled as well. In Heather B. Moore's book Women of the Book of Mormon, she explains that in Sariah's time, nomadic women in that area of the world were responsible to forage for food and make and serve each meal. According to Moore and retired BYU professor Camille Fronk, the women also helped with childbirth during the journey, and were responsible to collect water, gather firewood, weave materials like tent cords, and set up or take down the tents.

=== Murmuring in the desert ===
While Lehi had a vision and was commanded by the Lord to leave Jerusalem, Sariah had to leave behind her home and connections with no "personal witness" that it truly needed to happen, says Fronk. She worries in 1 Nephi 5:2-9 that "her sons are no more." Joseph Spencer notices the variety of pronouns she uses in conversation with Lehi, switching between "my," "thou," and "our," showing subtle doubt about her unity of purpose with Lehi. Lehi's responses, using mostly "I," and "my," fail to unify them, and she is only truly comforted by the return of her children. In The Book of Mormon for the Least of These, Fatimah S. Salleh and Margaret Olsen Hemming talk of Sariah's experience in the same passage. They claim that while most people read the verses as a negative perspective on Sariah, looking closer reveals her faith as she leaves her valuables, birthright, and people behind for the wilderness. Lehi sincerely acknowledges her sadness and comforts her in her grief In Second Witness: Analytical and Contextual Commentary, Brant A. Gardner suggests that in the scriptural account, Sariah showed no hesitation following Lehi into the wilderness and the only time she holds back is when she believes her sons might be lost. Gardner proposes that she only questions Lehi's calling as a prophet when his direction seems to have led her sons into unknown danger.

== Proposed Etymology ==
In the Bible, the Hebrew śryh is written Seraiah, which would represent Hebrew pronunciation of sera-yah or sra-ya, meaning "Jehovah has struggled". Jeffrey R. Chadwick of the Brigham Young University Jerusalem Center suggests based on recent evidence that the name is more like sar-yah, which means closer to "Jehovah is prince."

Alternatively, Camille Fronk says that the name Sariah could mean "Princess of Jehovah."

== Cultural Reception ==
Several poems have been written about Sariah, including Sariah by Marni Aspond Campbell, a portion of the poetry book Branches that Run over the Wall by Louisa Greene Richards, and a section of Book of Mormon Abridged in Rhyme by Orrin R. Wilcox. Another poem regarding Sariah is Sorrow and Song in the book Psalm & Selah: a poetic journey through The Book of Mormon.

== Family tree ==
Sariah's immediate family is shown in the diagram below.

Lehi	Sariah
Laman	Lemuel	Sam	Nephi	Jacob	Joseph

== Sources cited ==
- Gardner, Brant (2007). Second Witness. Volume 1 First Nephi. Vol. 1. Greg Kofford Books. ISBN 978-1-58958-041-1. Wikidata Q123118187.
- Fronk, Camille (2000). "Desert Epiphany: Sariah and the Women in 1 Nephi". Journal of Book of Mormon Studies. 9 (2).
- Hamilton Christian, Wendy (2002). "And Well She Can Persuade": The Power and Presence of Women in the Book of Mormon (MA thesis). Brigham Young University. 4597.
- Thomas, John Christopher (2016). A Pentecostal Reads the Book of Mormon: A Literary and Theological Introduction. CPT Press. ISBN 978-1-935931-55-3. Wikidata Q123196681.
- Reynolds, Noel B. (1980). "Nephi's Outline" (PDF). Brigham Young University Studies. 20 (2).
- Spencer, Joseph M. (2020). 1st Nephi. Brief Theological Introductions. Maxwell Institute. ISBN 978-0-8425-0007-4. Wikidata Q123273199.
