= Laman and Lemuel =

Book of Mormon characters

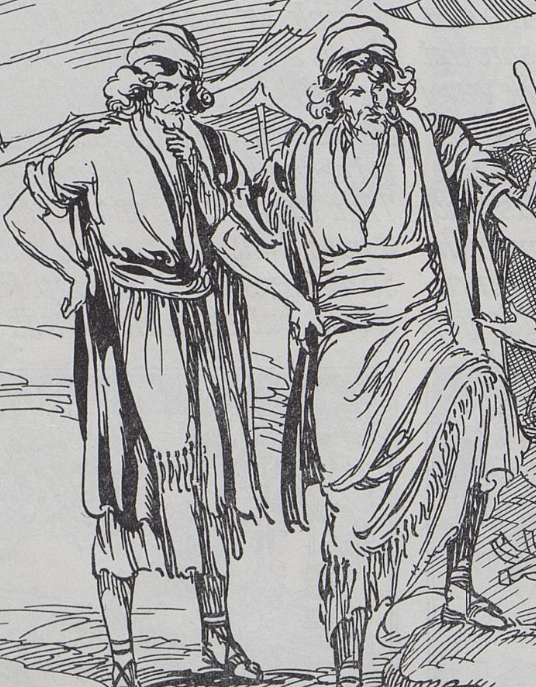
- Laman and Lemuel as depicted in Nephi Telling His Brothers About His Vision from The Children's Friend (April 1925)

Personal life
- Parents: Lehi (father); Sariah (mother)
- Era: c. Babylonian captivity

Religious life
- Founder of: Lamanites

In the Book of Mormon, Laman and Lemuel (/ˈleɪmən ... ˈlɛmjuːl/) are the two eldest sons of Lehi and the older brothers of Sam, Nephi, Jacob, and Joseph. According to the text, they lived around 600 BC. They were notable for their rebellion against Lehi and Nephi, becoming the primary antagonists of the First and Second Books of Nephi. Their descendants became known as the Lamanites and Lemuelites, while the descendants of Nephi and their other brothers became the Nephites. Disputes over the proper order of succession fueled disputes between the two peoples over the course of the Book of Mormon's narrative.

== Narrative ==
Laman and Lemuel are introduced as the two eldest sons of the prophet Lehi and his wife Sariah, and older brothers of Sam and Nephi. When Lehi announces that the family will flee Jerusalem, Lemuel and Laman "murmur" as they follow their father into the wilderness. Notably, their father names a river and a valley after Laman and Lemuel, respectively. Lehi then sends the pair with their younger brothers to retrieve the brass plates from Laban. Laman attempts to retrieve them first, failing to reason with Laban and escaping to brief his brothers on the issue. The sons of Lehi make a second attempt, using luxury goods to try to bribe Laban into giving them the plates. This attempt also fails, with Laban confiscating their property and the four brothers hiding in a cave. Laman and Lemuel then attack Nephi and Sam with a "rod". An angel appears, interrupting the assault. The angel indicates Nephi's eventual stewardship of the family and affirms that there will be divine aid to retrieve the plates. Laman and Lemuel are dubious about the practicality of this as Nephi goes into Jerusalem for a third try, this time alone. Nephi returns, bearing the plates, Laban's gear, and with Zoram in tow. Laman, Lemuel, and Sam initially do not recognize Nephi (as he is wearing Laban's armor) and attempt to escape. In Nephi's attempt to calm them, Zoram realizes that Nephi is not his master and has in fact killed him. Nephi extracts an oath from Zoram that he will leave Jerusalem with them. Zoram and the brothers then return to the tent of their parents.

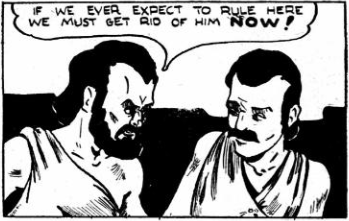
Laman and Lemuel conspire against Nephi (1948). Comic by John Philip Dalby.

Lehi then sends Zoram and his sons to the "land of Jerusalem" to retrieve Ishmael and his family. While Zoram and the sons of Lehi are escorting Ishmael's family to Lehi's encampment, there is a dispute that splits the party, with Laman and Lemuel taking one side and Sam and Nephi taking the other. Nephi then rebukes his brethren. Laman and Lemuel then tie up Nephi in an attempt to kill him. After praying for strength, Nephi escapes his restraints and Ishmael's family intercedes to halt the hostilities. Eventually they return to the camp of Sariah and Lehi.

After the two families begin traveling together, Lehi has a vision of his family and what he identifies as the Tree of Life. In the dream, Laman and Lemuel refuse to join their parents, Nephi, and Sam at the tree and do not eat the fruit. Later, Laman and Lemuel ask Nephi for his interpretation of the vision. Laman, Lemuel, Zoram, Sam, and Nephi then marry the daughters of Ishmael.

Many year pass in the wilderness. The party is guided by the Liahona which gives directions in the wilderness, particularly to such things as sources of food. When Nephi's bow breaks, Laman and Lemuel complain with the rest of the family. After Nephi makes a new bow and returns with sufficient food, they rejoice with the company. During the wilderness travails, Ishmael dies. This leads to an attempted mutiny, headed by Laman, that subsides quickly.

On the coast, Nephi is commanded to build a boat. Laman and Lemuel refuse to aid him until they are rebuked and smitten. While the brothers are building the vessel, Lehi and Sariah have had two more children, Jacob and Joseph. During the voyage, Laman and Lemuel assault Nephi after he rebukes them again. They refuse to untie him until a storm threatens to sink the party. After Nephi is released, the party lands in the New World.

Upon arrival, Lehi gathers his family for a farewell speech, in which he prophesies about and conditionally blesses his children and their descendants. Laman and Lemuel's children are blessed that their descendants will remain upon the land and eventually accept the gospel. Their children are also blessed that their sins will be held to the account of their parents. Once Lehi dies, discord arises again in the new colony, leading to the departure of Nephi's party. Laman and Lemuel and their descendants remain in the original site.

== Interpretation ==
=== Popular culture ===
==== The Book of Laman ====
In 2017, BCC Press published a novel entitled The Book of Laman by Mette Ivie Harrison. The novel reframes the events of First Nephi and Second Nephi from the imagined point of view of Laman. Dialogue reviewed the book as "a courageous addition to the many retellings of Book of Mormon stories that dot the landscape of Mormon literature." Rebecca Bateman, in a review on the Association of Mormon Letters blog, critiqued it for issues with characterization and for anachronisms in the text.

==== The Nephiad ====
Michael R. Collings wrote an epic poetry adaptation of the mission to retrieve the brass plates. In an interview with William Morris, Collings acknowledged the cowardly characterization of Laman and Lemuel in the epic, attributing it both to the source text and the Miltonian style of the piece.

=== River of Laman and Valley of Lemuel ===
In 1 Nephi 2:2–11, Lehi's party makes its way from Jerusalem towards the promised land. The passage also recounts the naming of a river and a valley after Laman and Lemuel. Hugh Nibley, an LDS scholar and apologist, thought this area referred to as "the borders" was by Jabal al-Lawz (Arabic: جَبَل ٱللَّوْز), also known as Gebel (el-Lawz), a mountain sometimes identified with Mount Sinai although most people reject this classification.

=== Proposed etymology ===
"Lemuel" (Hebrew: לְמוּאֵל) is the name of a Biblical king mentioned in Proverbs 31, but otherwise unknown. Hugh Nibley remarked that Lemuel has a "good pure Arabic name, incidentally".

== Family ==
Lehi	Sariah
Laman	Lemuel	Sam	Nephi	Jacob	Joseph
