= Sam (Book of Mormon) =

Third son of Lehi in the Book of Mormon

Sam is a minor character in the early part of the Book of Mormon narrative. He is the third son of Lehi and the older brother of Nephi, the narrator of the Book of Mormon's first two books. Sam is almost always allied with Nephi in conflicts with their older brothers, Laman and Lemuel. In the later books of the Book of Mormon, Sam's descendants are combined with Nephi's descendants and simply called "Nephites".

== Family ==
Lehi	Sariah
Laman	Lemuel	Sam	Nephi	Jacob	Joseph

== Textual descriptions ==
The Book of Mormon presents Sam as a Nephi's constant ally against their older brothers, Laman and Lemuel. When the original Lehite colony splits into Nephites and Lamanites, Sam and his family side with the Nephites. In their 1992 article "Seven Tribes, and Aspect of Lehi's Legacy", John L. Sorenson, John A. Tvedtnes, and John W. Welch point out that, while tribes of Nephites, Lamanites, and Lemuelites persist throughout the text, as do Jacobites and Josephites (Lehi's younger sons born in the desert), there are never Samites in the Book of Mormon, which Grant Hardy suggests could mean that Sam "only had daughters".

== Commentary ==
In a 1996 article, Ken Haubrock notes the paucity of information that the Book of Mormon provides about Sam. "We have only the barest sketch of him as a person," laments Haubrock. "This would not seem out of the ordinary except when we realize that Sam was witness to early Nephite history. Almost every hardship and adventure that Lehi's family went through ... [was] probably also experienced by Sam." Haubrook also suggests that, by directing that Sam's posterity be combined with Nephi's, Lehi "implies that Nephi is receiving a double portion—just as his ancestor Joseph did through Ephraim and Manasseh—and that Sam and his decedents are to be the second half of that double portion."

Sam is the only one of Nephi's brothers who partakes of the Tree of Life in Lehi's Dream sequence in 1 Nephi 8. Grant Hardy identifies him as "an early believer in Nephi's revelations and a close ally". Brant Gardner refers to him as "Nephi's first convert" and argues that Nephi and Sam represent the two gifts of the spirit identified in Doctrine and Covenants 46:13-14: "To some it is given by the Holy Ghost to know that Jesus Christ is the Son of God, and that he was crucified for the sins of the world. To others it is given to believe on their words." In this case, Nephi's gift was to receive "direct confirmation" of Lehi's vision of the Tree of Life, while Sam's gift was to hear and believe Nephi's testimony. "Both are gifts of the Spirit, and neither is superior to the other," Gardner concludes. "Both methods lead to the same end. Both Nephi and Sam remain faithful and follow their father. Sam receives the same blessing as Nephi."

Writing in Understanding the Book of Mormon, Hardy suggests that Nephi flattens all of his brothers into collective characters who either help or hinder his own efforts. "The only time that Laman does anything independently is when he goes to Laban's house to ask for the plates," Hardy writes, "otherwise, he always speaks and acts in conjunction with Lemuel. Lemuel, in turn, never opposes Laman in any way, and never appears without Laman close by." Similarly, Nephi portrays Sam as "a rather passive ally of Nephi's in family dynamics-who is bland to the point of being nearly a nonentity." Hardy calls this "selective characterization" that Nephi likely uses as a narrative strategy "in order to sharpen the main conflict between himself and Laman and Lemuel."

== Literary representations ==
In most poetic and novelistic representations of the Book of Mormon, Sam is portrayed as Nephi's loyal sidekick with very little personality of his own—much as he is portrayed in the text of the Book of Mormon. However, several Latter-day Saint poets have described Sam in poetry. Mildred Tobler Hunt's poem "Sam Speaks", for example, portrays Sam's willingness to leave his beloved city of Jerusalem when his father and brother confirmed that it was God's will:

I say I loved it well,
But when my brother echoed my own feeling
That what Father had seen indeed was true,
I gathered up our goods,
Climbed astride a dun-flecked camel,
Saw my shining city for the last time
In the cool, clear light of early morning,
Its towers framed in our own palm trees.
I saluted it,
Then turned my face towards the desert
And never looked back.
