= Outline of the Book of Mormon =

Overview of and topical guide to the Book of Mormon

The following outline is provided as an overview of and topical guide to the Book of Mormon:

The Book of Mormon is a sacred text of the Latter Day Saint movement, which adherents believe contains the writings of ancient prophets who lived on the American continent from approximately 2200 BC to AD 421. It was first published in March 1830 by Joseph Smith as The Book of Mormon: An Account Written by the Hand of Mormon upon Plates Taken from the Plates of Nephi.

== Classification of the Book of Mormon ==
The Book of Mormon can be described as all of the following:

- Scripture –
  - Revelation (Latter Day Saints) –
    - Standard works –
      - Latter Day Saint movement and engraved metal plates –
        - Literature –
          - Book –

== Books of the Book of Mormon ==
- Small Plates of Nephi
  - First Book of Nephi
  - Second Book of Nephi
  - Book of Jacob
  - Book of Enos
  - Book of Jarom
  - Book of Omni
  - Words of Mormon
- Mormon's abridgment of
  the Large Plates of Nephi
  - Book of Mosiah
  - Book of Alma
  - Book of Helaman
  - Third Nephi
  - Fourth Nephi
  - Book of Mormon
  - Book of Ether
  - Book of Moroni

== Historicity of Book of Mormon ==
- Historicity of the Book of Mormon
  - Linguistics and the Book of Mormon
  - Book of Mormon anachronisms
  - Limited geography model
  - Proposed Book of Mormon geographical setting

== Origin of Book of Mormon ==
- Origin of the Book of Mormon
  - Golden plates
  - Book of Mormon witnesses
  - Three Witnesses
  - Eight Witnesses
  - Angel Moroni
  - Anthon Transcript
  - Reformed Egyptian
  - Spalding–Rigdon theory of Book of Mormon authorship
  - The Book of Mormon and the King James Bible
  - View of the Hebrews
  - Lost 116 pages
  - Mosiah priority

== Book of Mormon witnesses ==
Main article

- Book of Mormon witnesses

Three Witnesses

- Three Witnesses
- Oliver Cowdery
- Martin Harris (Latter Day Saints)
- David Whitmer
- Church of Christ (Whitmerite)

Eight Witnesses

- Eight Witnesses
- Christian Whitmer
- Jacob Whitmer
- Peter Whitmer Jr.
- John Whitmer
- Hiram Page
- Joseph Smith Sr.
- Hyrum Smith
- Samuel H. Smith (Latter Day Saints)

Another Witness

- Mary Whitmer

== Prophets and People ==
=== Prophets ===
- List of Book of Mormon prophets
  - Lehi
  - Nephi
  - Jacob
  - Enos
  - Jarom
  - Omni
  - Abinadom
  - Amaleki
  - King Benjamin
  - Mosiah
  - Abinadi
  - Alma the Elder
  - Alma the Younger
  - Sons of Mosiah
  - Omner
  - Himni
  - Amulek
  - Zeezrom
  - Helaman
  - Shiblon
  - Helaman II
  - Nephi
  - Lehi
  - Samuel the Lamanite
  - Nephi
  - Timothy
  - Nephi, son of Nephi the Disciple
  - Mathoni
  - Mathonihah
  - Kumen
  - Kumenonhi
  - Shemnon
  - Amos
  - Amos II
  - Ammaron
  - Mormon
  - Moroni
  - Brother of Jared
  - Ether

=== People ===
- List of Book of Mormon people
  - Aaron (Lamanite)
  - Aaron (Nephite)
  - Abinadom
  - Abish (Book of Mormon)
  - Aha (Book of Mormon)
  - Akish
  - Amaleki
  - Amaleki (Book of Mormon explorer)
  - Amalickiah
  - Amaron
  - Aminadab
  - Aminadi
  - Amlici
  - Ammah (Book of Mormon)
  - Ammaron
  - Ammon (Book of Mormon explorer)
  - Ammon (Book of Mormon missionary)
  - Ammoron
  - Amoron
  - Amos, son of Amos
  - Amos, son of Nephi
  - Amulek
  - Amulon
  - Antiomno
  - Antionah
  - Antionum
  - Antipus
  - Cezoram
  - Gazelem
  - Gid (Book of Mormon)
  - Gideon (Book of Mormon)
  - Helaman, son of Helaman
  - Himni
  - Ishmael (Book of Mormon)
  - Jared (founder of Jaredites)
  - Joseph (Book of Mormon)
  - King Mosiah I
  - King Mosiah II
  - King Noah
  - Laban (Book of Mormon)
  - Lachoneus
  - Laman and Lemuel
  - Lamoni
  - Limhi
  - Moron (Book of Mormon)
  - Captain Moroni
  - Moronihah
  - Mulek
  - Nehor
  - Omner
  - Omni (Book of Mormon record keeper)
  - Paanchi (Book of Mormon)
  - Pahoran
  - Sam (Book of Mormon)
  - Sariah
  - Shiblon
  - Shiz
  - Sons of Mosiah
  - Teancum
  - Zedekiah
  - Zeezrom
  - Zeniff
  - Zenos
  - Zeram, Amnor, Manti, and Limher
- Book of Mormon rulers
- Jaredite kings

=== Groups ===
- List of Book of Mormon groups
  - Amlicites
  - Amalekites
  - Amulonites
  - Anti-Nephi-Lehies, or People of Ammon
  - Gadianton robbers
  - Gentile
  - Ishmaelites
  - Jaredites
  - King-men
  - Lamanites
  - Mulekites
  - Nephites
  - Order of the Nehors
  - Stripling Warriors
  - Zarahemla
  - Zeniff, People of
  - Zoramites

== Places ==
- List of Book of Mormon places
  - City of Aaron
  - Ablom
  - Plains of Agosh
  - Wilderness of Akish
  - Valley of Alma
  - City of Ammonihah
  - Hill Amnihu
  - Land of Amulon
  - Angola
  - Ani-Anti
  - Land of Antionum
  - Antiparah
  - Mount Antipas
  - Boaz
  - City of Bountiful (Book of Mormon)
  - Hill Comnor
  - City of Cumeni
  - Cumorah
  - Desolation
  - Land of first inheritance
  - Lehi-Nephi
  - Valley of Lemuel
  - Waters of Mormon
  - Land of Moron
  - Nahom
  - Narrow neck of land
  - Narrow strip of wilderness
  - City of Nephi
  - Land northward
  - Hill Shim
  - River Sidon
  - Land Southward
  - Zarahemla

== Book of Mormon words and phrases ==
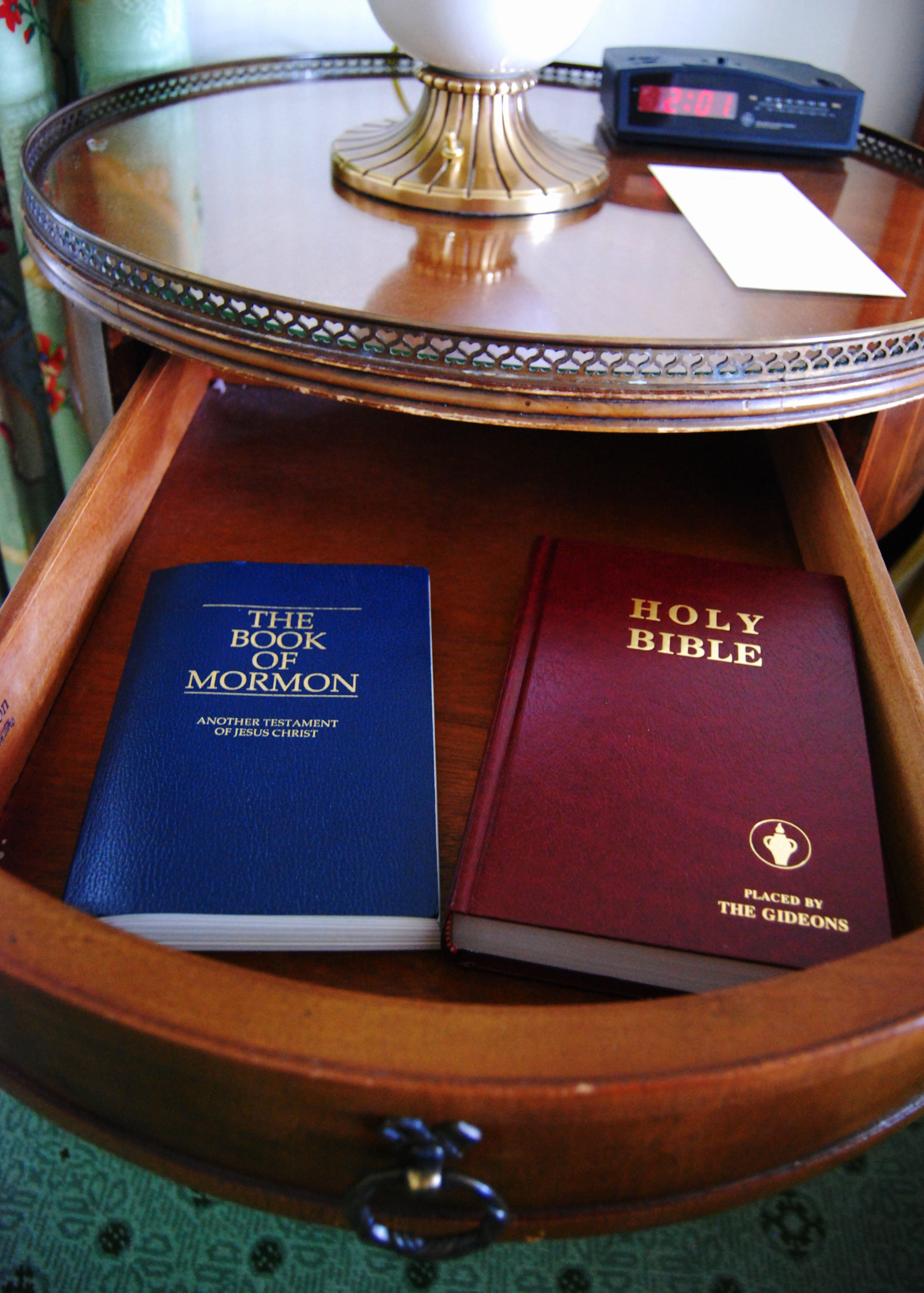
Book of Mormon and the King James Bible.

- Deseret (Book of Mormon)
- God Loveth His Children
- Great and abominable church
- Liahona (Book of Mormon)
- Parable of the Olive Tree
- Record of the Nephites
- Three Nephites
- Tree of life vision
- Plan of salvation (Latter Day Saints)
  - Spirit world (Latter Day Saints)

== Book of Mormon artifacts ==
- The Joseph Smith Papers
- Latter Day Saint movement and engraved metal plates
- List of plates in Mormonism
- Lost 116 pages
- Urim and Thummim (Latter Day Saints)

== Organizations that study the Book of Mormon ==
By Study and Also By Faith, a documentary video about the Maxwell Institute.

- Foundation for Ancient Research and Mormon Studies
- FAIR (Faithful Answers, Informed Response)
- Interpreter Foundation
- John Whitmer Historical Association
- Neal A. Maxwell Institute for Religious Scholarship
- Religious Studies Center

== Publications about the Book of Mormon ==
- Dialogue: A Journal of Mormon Thought
- International Journal of Mormon Studies
- Interpreter: A Journal of Latter-day Saint Faith and Scholarship
- Journal of Book of Mormon Studies
- Mormon Studies Review (journal)
- Studies of the Book of Mormon (book of essays)
- Sunstone (magazine)

== Book of Mormon scholars ==
- Paul R. Cheesman
- Terryl Givens
- Grant Hardy
- Brent Metcalfe
- Hugh Nibley
- Daniel C. Peterson
- B. H. Roberts
- Janne M. Sjödahl
- Royal Skousen
- John L. Sorenson
- Sidney B. Sperry
- Dan Vogel
- John W. Welch

== Films about the Book of Mormon ==
- LDS Church films
  - How Rare a Possession
  - Book of Mormon Videos
- LDS cinema
  - The Book of Mormon Movie, Vol. 1: The Journey
  - Passage to Zarahemla

== See also ==
- Index of articles related to the Church of Jesus Christ of Latter-day Saints
- Outline of the Church of Jesus Christ of Latter-day Saints
- Outline of Joseph Smith
- Reformed Egyptian
