= Book of Jarom =

Fifth book in the Book of Mormon

The Book of Jarom (/ˈdʒærəm/) is the fifth book in the Book of Mormon. According to the text it was written by Jarom, who was the son of Enos and a descendant of Jacob, the brother of the prophet Nephi.

The Book of Jarom is very short, consisting of only fifteen verses. According to the Book of Mormon, Jarom was the son of Enos, the grandson of Jacob, and the great-grandson of Lehi. He kept the commandment of his father to preserve the plates, and in turn he commanded his son Omni to do the same. In the meantime, he inscribed these few verses on them. In his account, Jarom described the Lamanites and explained that the Nephites had many wars against them. He also narrated that the Nephites did not listen to God but still kept the Mosaic Law.

== Structure ==
In the Book of Mormon, the Book of Jarom succeeds the Book of Enos and precedes the Book of Omni; of the three, it is the shortest book.

Structure
| Section | Verses |
|---|---|
| Jarom has the plates | 1–2 |
| Jarom's people | 3–4 |
| Nephites and Lamanites | 5-9 |
| Teachers among the people | 10–12 |
| Time period of the events | 13 |
| Jarom's last words | 14–15 |

== Narrative ==
Jarom narrates the Book of Jarom and begins his record explaining that he will not write his prophesies and revelations because he feels that similar things have been written by his forefathers. Besides which, Jarom explains, there is not enough room left on the plates to write very much. But Jarom recommends that his readers go to the large plates if they want more information; University of Vermont associate professor of English Elizabeth Fenton points out that the only available version of the large plates is Mormon's abridgement. Jarom further states that the small plates are written for the Lamanites, though he expresses little hope for them in their present condition. The Lamanites, Jarom explains, murder and drink animal blood.

Jarom says that the laws of the land are strict and that many of the Nephites are unwilling to listen to God's words. Meanwhile, God is merciful and protects them in their wars against the Lamanites. During these wars, their leaders are faithful to God and strengthen the cities against attacks. Despite their lack of spiritual interest, the Nephites grow in population and keep the law of Moses. After possessing the plates for 59 years, Jarom passes them to his son Omni.

== Interpretation ==
=== Literary ===
The Book of Jarom is the shortest book in the Book of Mormon text, excepting the explanatory Words of Mormon. Fatimah Salleh and Margaret Hemming, co-authors of the three-volume series The Book of Mormon for the Least of These, suggest that Jarom's choice of audience (the Lamanites) is based on his father Enos's covenant with God, in which the Lamanites would return to God. This impacts Jarom's practice of record keeping, Salleh and Hemming argue.

Due to the absence of events while maintaining a "narrative voice", Jarom's account has been called an "unnarration" by Elizabeth Fenton, who adopted the term from Robyn Warhol. Brigham Young University professor Donald W. Parry contends that the book follows an "AabcdBABBACDEEDCBAdbca" chiasmus pattern that repeats ideas of faith, destruction, and obedience to commandments, among other things.

=== Theological ===
Professor of scripture, Nicholas Frederick, believes that according to Jarom, the Nephites keep the Law of Moses as a way to look forward to the then-future advent of Jesus.

== Works cited ==
- Arnold, Marilyn (1996). Sweet is the Word: Reflections on the Book of Mormon, Its Narrative, Teachings, and People. Covenant Communications. ISBN 1-55503-925-1.
- Fenton, Elizabeth (2013). "Open Canons: Sacred History and American History in The Book of Mormon". The Journal of Nineteenth-Century Americanists. 1 (2). Johns Hopkins University Press – via ProjectMuse.
- Frederick, Nicholas J. (2017). "'The Intent for Which It Was Given': How the Book of Mormon Teaches the Value of Scripture and Revelation". Religious Educator. 18 (1): 63–79.
- Gardner, Brant (2007). Second Witness. Volume 3 Enos—Mosiah. Vol. 3. Greg Kofford Books. ISBN 978-1-58958-043-5. Wikidata Q123118236.
- Givens, Terryl L. (2009). The Book of Mormon: A Very Short Introduction. Oxford University Press. doi:10.1093/ACTRADE/9780195369311.001.0001. ISBN 978-0-19-936567-8. Wikidata Q114004901.
- Hardy, Grant, ed. (2023). The Annotated Book of Mormon. Oxford University Press. ISBN 978-0-19-008220-8. OL 46783409M. Wikidata Q122259222.
- Harris, Sharon J. (2020). "Jarom". Enos, Jarom, Omni: A Brief Theological Introduction. Maxwell Institute for Religious Scholarship. pp. 50–76. ISBN 978-0-8425-0015-9.
- Parry, Donald W. (2007). Poetic Parallelisms in the Book of Mormon. Provo, Utah, USA: Maxwell Institute Publications. ISBN 978-0-934893-36-7 – via ScholarsArchive.
- Salleh, Fatimah; Hemming, Margaret Olsen (2020). The Book of Mormon for the Least of These Vol. 1. Vol. 1. By Common Consent Press. ISBN 978-1-948218-23-8. Wikidata Q123378840.
- Thomas, John Christopher (2016). A Pentecostal Reads the Book of Mormon: A Literary and Theological Introduction. CPT Press. ISBN 978-1-935931-55-3. Wikidata Q123196681.

Book of Jarom Small Plates of Nephi
| Preceded by Enos | Book of Mormon | Succeeded by Omni |
