= Book of Enos =

Fourth book in the Book of Mormon

The Book of Enos (/ˈiːnəs/) is the fourth book in the Book of Mormon, a religious text of the Latter Day Saint movement. Its text is a portion of the small plates of Nephi. According to the text it was written by Enos, a Nephite prophet.

== Identity of Enos ==
According to the Book of Mormon, the prophet Jacob, younger brother of the prophet Nephi, had a son named Enos (Jacob 7:27). The Book of Enos follows immediately after the Book of Jacob in manuscripts of the Book of Mormon as well as all printed editions (Jacob 7:27 to Enos 1:1) However, in the opening verse of the Book of Enos (Enos 1:1), Enos mentions his father but does not name him, neither expressly affirming that his father was Jacob nor that his uncle was Nephi. It is a reasonable assumption that Enos was the son of Jacob as referenced in the preceding verse Jacob 7:27, but that relationship is not established in the Book of Enos itself.

Given that it had been 179 years between the time when Lehi and Nephi left Jerusalem and when Enos "began to be old" (Enos 1:25) and was "soon" to "go to the place of [his] rest" (Enos 1:27), it is possible either that Jacob and Enos each lived to about 95 years of age, with Jacob fathering Enos late in life, or that Jacob had one son named Enos (Jacob 7:27) and that the Enos of the Book of Enos was another Enos altogether, perhaps a grandson or great-grandson of Jacob. However, Enos's ancestry clearly leads directly to Lehi and Sariah through Jacob.

== Summary of the Book of Enos ==
This short book consists of a single chapter, relating Enos' conversion after praying all day and all night, following with his subsequent dialogue with the Lord. It also discusses the redemption of the Nephites and their enemies, the Lamanites, and contains prophecies of future Nephite and Lamanite generations. Additionally, it contains descriptions of the Lamanites. The style of Enos resembles that of Erich Auerbach in his Mimesis and that of Nephi, Enos's ancestor and the Book of Mormon's opening narrator.

== Narrative ==
Enos hunts in the woods and remembers the gospel that his father taught him; as a result, he kneels and cries all day and during the night for the salvation of his soul. Then the voice of God tells Enos that he is forgiven of his sins. Enos believes the voice, but he wonders how the forgiveness is actually accomplished. In response, God explains that Enos is forgiven because he has faith in Jesus Christ, even though he has never seen or heard Christ.

Enos then prays for the salvation of the Nephites, but God says they will be blessed or punished according to their obedience. Enos, fearing that the Nephites will refuse to obey the commandments of God, then prays for the Lamanites who oppress them; he asks God for the Lamanites' preservation. Additionally, he prays that God will preserve a record of the Nephites so that someday the Lamanites too might be brought to salvation. Only faith in Christ will save them, but God makes a covenant with Enos that he will bring the records of the Nephites to the Lamanites in due time.

After this experience, Enos takes up the mantle of prophet and preaches among the Nephites, fearing their destruction. In the record, Enos does not say whether he is successful at converting the Nephites, but he does say that the Nephites fail to convert the Lamanites. Before Enos dies he gives the records to his son Jarom, who continues the narrative in the Book of Jarom.

== Portrayal of Lamanites ==
Throughout the narrative, Enos characterizes the Lamanites as possessing an unmoving hatred. According to Enos, the Lamanites become a wild, idolatrous, and bloodthirsty people, eating predatory animals. They live in tents, wander around in the wilderness, wear loincloths, shave their heads, and often eat raw meat. Enos explains that they are skilled with bows, cimeters, and axes and continually seek to destroy the Nephites.

Fatimah Salleh and Margaret Olsen Hemming noticed that Enos implies that Lamanite practices, like eating raw meat, connote corruption, even though the same behavior had no negative connotations earlier in the Book of Mormon when the Nephites and Lamanites were still one people. Thus, Enos demonstrates "writer's bias." Hemming and Salleh concluded that Enos's criticism of the Lamanites is based more on prejudice and what is culturally acceptable to the Nephite rather than based on a charge from God.

== Book of Enos interpretation ==
Summary	Verses
Receives forgiveness	1-8
Prays for Nephites, Lamanites, and Record	9-18
Prophesies of future Lamanite and Nephite generations	19-24
Writes final words	25-27

Enos begins his account in a manner that is similar to Nephi's: he mentions parental influence, passed on through religious counsel. The narrative not only begins with this but also ends with it. A difference from the style of Nephi is that Enos does not quote scripture in his narrative. Terryl L. Givens also argues that Enos' intended literary audience leans toward the Lamanites, as the Nephites will eventually be destroyed.

According to author Dennis Largey, the style of the Book of Enos implies that Enos did not narrate it over a long period of time but may have narrated it shortly before he died. On another note, literary critic Richard Rust compares the style and syntax of the Book of Enos and that of Erich Auerbach's Mimesis account of when Abraham is about to sacrifice Isaac. Specifically, Rust noticed in both accounts similar uses of modifiers as well as “and.” Additionally, Enos fills his narrative with words such as "wrestling" that generally appeal to a reader's emotions, says Protestant theologian John Christopher Thomas. The familial and covenantal responsibilities that Enos feels bring a serious but personal flavor into the narrative, according to BYU English professor Sharon J. Harris.

== See also ==
- Book of Mormon

== Works cited ==
- Bingman, Margaret (1978). Encyclopedia of the Book of Mormon. Herald House. ISBN 0-8309-0199-X. Wikidata Q123363520.
- Givens, Terryl L. (2009). The Book of Mormon: A Very Short Introduction. Oxford University Press. doi:10.1093/actrade/9780195369311.001.0001. ISBN 978-0-19-936567-8. Wikidata Q114004901.
- Hardy, Grant (2010). Understanding the Book of Mormon: A Reader's Guide. Oxford University Press. ISBN 978-0-19-973170-1. OL 24418834M. Wikidata Q123382112.
- Harris, Sharon J. (2020). "Enos". Enos, Jarom, Omni: A Brief Theological Introduction. Maxwell Institute for Religious Scholarship. pp. 18–48. ISBN 978-0-8425-0015-9.
- Largey, Dennis L. (2003). "Enos, book of". In Largey, Dennis L.; Arnold, Marilyn; Ball, Terry; Dahl, Larry E.; Parry, Donald; Seely, David R.; Williams, Clyde J. (eds.). Book of Mormon Reference Companion. Deseret Book Company. p. 245. ISBN 1-57345-231-9. Wikidata Q123364479.
- Miller, Adam S. (2023). "Words Sunk Deep: Indwelling, Necessity, and Reconciliation in Enos 1". Journal of Book of Mormon Studies. 32: 13. doi:10.5406/23744774.32.01/381242 (inactive 4 January 2026) – via Scholarly Publishing Collective.
- Rust, Richard Dilworth (1997). Feasting Upon the Word: The Literary Testimony of the Book of Mormon. Deseret Book Company. p. 146-147, 192-193. ISBN 1-57345-204-1. Wikidata Q124214275.
- Salleh, Fatimah; Hemming, Margaret (2020). "Enos". The Book of Mormon for the Least of These Vol. 1. Vol. 1. By Common Consent Press. pp. 133–139. ISBN 978-1-948218-23-8. Wikidata Q123378840.
- Sperry, Sidney (1948). Our Book of Mormon (1st ed.). Salt Lake City, Utah, USA: Stevens and Wallace, Inc. pp. 41, 43.
- Sperry, Sidney B. (1995). "What the Book of Mormon Is" (PDF). Journal of Book of Mormon Studies. 4 (1): 14 – via BYU ScholarsArchive.
- Thomas, John Christopher (2016). "Enos". A Pentecostal Reads the Book of Mormon: A Literary and Theological Introduction. CPT Press. pp. 53–56. ISBN 978-1-935931-55-3. Wikidata Q123196681.

Book of Enos Small Plates of Nephi
Preceded by Jacob	Book of Mormon	Succeeded by Jarom
