= List of Book of Mormon prophets =

The Book of Mormon describes a number of individuals unique to its narrative as prophets. Here, the prophets included are those who, according to the narrative, inherited the plates of Nephi and who otherwise are called prophets within the text. Also included are the high priests mentioned and the missionaries.

== In Nephi ==
The following prophets (or in some cases, simply people who kept the record and passed it to future generations) are those mentioned in the plates of Nephi (1 Nephi through Omni).

- Lehi^{1}, father of Laman^{1}, Lemuel, Nephi^{1}, Sam, Jacob^{2}, Joseph^{2}, and several daughters (c. 600 BC).
- Nephi^{1}, third son of Lehi^{1} (c. 600 BC).
- Jacob^{2}, fifth son of Lehi^{1}, father of Enos^{2} (c. 599 BC).
- Enos^{2}, son of Jacob^{2}, father or ancestor of Jarom.
- Jarom, son or descendant of Enos^{2} and father of Omni (c. 399–361 BC).
- Omni, son of Jarom, father of Amaron (c. 390 BC).
- Amaron, brother of Chemish and son of Omni (c. 3rd century BC).
- Abinadom, son of Chemish and father of Amaleki^{1} (c. 3rd century BC).
- Amaleki^{1}, son of Abinadom (c. 130 BC).
- Neum, Hebrew prophet quoted by Nephi^{1}, possibly same as Nahum.
- Zenock, apocryphal prophet of ancient Israel, quoted by Nephi^{1}.
- Zenos, apocryphal prophet of ancient Israel, quoted by Nephi^{1}.

== In Mormon and Moroni ==
The following prophets are those mentioned in Mormon's abridgement of the large plates of Nephi (Mosiah through Moroni, excluding Ether).

- Benjamin, known as King Benjamin, son of Mosiah^{1}, father of Mosiah^{2}, Helorum, and Helaman^{1} (c. 120 BC).
- Mosiah^{2}, eldest son of King Benjamin, father of Aaron^{3}, Ammon^{3}, Himni, and Omner (c. 154–91 BC).
- Ammon^{3}, second son of Mosiah^{2}.
- Abinadi, possibly unnamed brother of Amaleki^{1}, and son of Abinadom (c. 150 BC).
- Alma^{1}, known as Alma the Elder. Father of Alma^{2} (c. 173–91 BC).
- Alma^{2}, known as Alma the Younger. Son of Alma^{1}, father of Helaman^{2}, Shiblon, and Corianton (c. 100–73 BC).
- Sons of Mosiah^{2} (c. 100 BC).
  - Aaron^{3}, eldest son of Mosiah^{2}.
  - Ammon^{3}, second son of Mosiah^{2}.
  - Omner, third son of Mosiah^{2}.
  - Himni, fourth son of Mosiah^{2}.
- Amulek, son of Giddonah^{1} (c. 82–74 BC).
- Zeezrom, converted Nephite lawyer (c. 82 BC).
- Helaman^{2}, eldest son of Alma^{2}, brother of Shiblon and Corianton, father of Helaman^{3} (c. 74–56 BC).
- Shiblon, second son of Alma^{2}, brother to Helaman^{2} and Corianton (c. 74 BC).
- Corianton, third son of Alma^{2}, brother to Helaman^{2} and Shiblon (c. 74 BC).
- Helaman^{3}, eldest son of Helaman^{2}, father of Nephi^{2}, Lehi^{4} and Moronihah^{1} (c. 53 BC).
- Nephi^{2}, eldest son of Helaman^{3}, brother of Lehi^{4} and Moronihah^{1}, father of Nephi^{3} (c. 45 BC).
- Lehi^{4}, younger son of Helaman^{3}, brother of Nephi^{2} and Moronihah^{1} (c. 45 BC).
- Samuel, known as Samuel the Lamanite (c. 6 BC).
- Lachoneus^{1}, father of Lachoneus^{2} (c. AD 1).
- Gidgiddoni, appointed judge by Lachoneus^{1} (c. AD 16).
- Disciples of resurrected Christ, (c. AD 34).
  - Nephi^{3}, known as Nephi the Disciple, eldest son of Nephi^{2}, brother of Timothy.^{,}
  - Timothy, son of Nephi^{2}, brother of Nephi^{3}.
  - Jonas^{1}, son of Nephi^{3}.
  - Mathoni, brother of Mathonihah.
  - Mathonihah, brother of Mathoni.
  - Kumen.
  - Kumenonhi.
  - Jeremiah^{2}.
  - Shemnon.
  - Jonas^{2}.
  - Zedekiah^{2}.
  - Isaiah^{2}.
- Nephi^{4}, son of Nephi^{3} the disciple, father or ancestor of Amos^{2}.
- Amos^{2}, son or descendant of Nephi^{4} (c. AD 110–194).
- Amos^{3}, son or descendant of Amos^{2}, brother of Ammaron (c. AD 194–306).
- Ammaron, son or descendant of Amos^{2}, brother of Amos^{3} (c. AD 306).
- Mormon^{2}, son of Mormon^{1}, descendant of Nephi^{1}, father of Moroni^{2} (c. AD 333).
- Moroni^{2}, son of Mormon^{2}.

== In Ether ==
- Mahonri Moriancumer, known as the brother of Jared^{2}.
- Ether, descendant of Coriantor.

== Biblical prophets ==
Various Old Testament prophets are also quoted or mentioned in the Book of Mormon. These include:

- Adam
- Enoch
- Noah
- Joseph
- Jacob
- Moses
- Isaiah
- David via Psalms
- John the Revelator

== See also ==
- List of Book of Mormon people
- The Church of Jesus Christ of Latter-day Saints
  - President of the Church
  - Prophet, seer, and revelator
- Table of prophets of Abrahamic religions
