= Ralph Hancock =

Ralph Hancock may refer to:

- Ralph Hancock (landscape gardener) (1893–1950), Welsh landscape gardener and author
- Ralph Hancock (cricketer) (1887–1914), English cricketer
- Ralph C. Hancock, professor of political science at Brigham Young University (BYU)
