= Enos (Book of Mormon prophet) =

Son of Jacob, a Nephite prophet and author of the Book of Enos

Enos (/ˈiːnəs/; Hebrew: אֱנוֹשׁ) is a figure in the Book of Mormon who is a son or grandson of Jacob, a Nephite prophet and author of the Book of Enos. According to the Book of Mormon, Enos lived sometime during the 5th century BC, writing his record near his death 179 years after Lehi left Jerusalem, or around 421 BC.

== Narration ==
=== Nephite record keeping ===
According to the Book of Mormon narrative, Enos was third in the series of record keepers who maintained the record of the Nephites, a set of metal plates containing the spiritual and secular history of the Nephites. Enos was given charge of the record by his father, Jacob, son of Lehi and brother of Nephi. Both Nephi and Jacob had kept the record previously, recording First and Second Nephi and the Book of Jacob, respectively. Enos's contribution to the record, the Book of Enos, consists of a single chapter, told in the first person, describing his own conversion and subsequent ministry.

Following Enos's death the record of the Nephites was kept by Enos' son, Jarom.

=== Early life ===
No details of Enos's early life are given except that he had been taught by his father "in the nurture and the admonition of the Lord". Because Enos begins his story by telling of his "wrestle which [he] had before God, before [he] received a remission of [his] sins", it is sometimes assumed that he had been rebellious prior to that time. President Spencer W. Kimball said, "Like many sons of good families he strayed. How heinous were his sins I do not know, but they must have been grievous".

=== Conversion ===
Enos relates that, while hunting beasts in the forest, his "soul hungered" and he knelt and prayed for forgiveness. His prayer continued throughout the day and into the night, until he heard a voice, saying: "Enos, thy sins are forgiven thee, and thou shalt be blessed". Having obtained personal forgiveness, Enos continued to pray on behalf of his people, the Nephites, and was given to understand that they would be blessed "according to their diligence in keeping [God's] commandments". His faith being strengthened by these revelations, he began to pray for "[his] brethren, the Lamanites", who had become estranged from the Nephites and were now their enemies. He received a promise that the record of the Nephites would be preserved and would be brought forth to the Lamanites in the Lord's "due time".

=== Ministry ===
According to the Book of Mormon, following his conversion, Enos went forth prophesying to the Nephites. He testifies that the Nephites tried to "restore the Lamanites to the true faith in God", but that they were unsuccessful. He describes the Lamanites as having become "wild, and ferocious, and a blood-thirsty people". The Nephites, in contrast, are industrious at farming and herding, but Enos makes it clear that they were "stiffnecked" and continual preaching of the word of God was necessary to keep them from "going down speedily to destruction".

At the close of his record, Enos testifies of his unshakeable faith in his Redeemer.

== Interpretation ==
=== Representing a dual message of the Book of Mormon ===
In Americanist Approaches to the Book of Mormon, literary critic Terryl Givens suggests, in agreement with Grant Hardy, that there are two types of salvation emphasized by the Book of Mormon, both exemplified by Enos. He prays for his individual salvation and shortly after, prays for the salvation of his people. Enos demonstrates, according to Givens, a broader theme of the book promoting both an individual relationship with Christ as well as the gathering of scattered Israel.

=== Possible origin of the name ===
The name "Enos" or "Enosh" (Hebrew: אֱנוֹשׁ) appears in at least two books of the Bible. It means "mortal man", in Hebrew, which Hugh Nibley remarks as being similar in definition to the name "Adam".

In the Book of Genesis, Enos is the first son of Seth who figures in the Generations of Adam, and consequently referred to within the genealogies of Chronicles, and the genealogy of Jesus in the Gospel of Luke.

== Family ==
Between the records of Jacob and Enos, more than 120 years is covered, which leads some to question Enos' timeline. It has been suggested that Jacob may not have been his father, rather his grandfather, as Enos never mentions his father by name.

Jacob
Enos
Jarom
Omni
Amaron	Chemish
Abinadom
Amaleki

Or, alternately:

Jacob
Enos₁
Enos₂
Jarom
Omni
Amaron	Chemish
Abinadom
Amaleki

== See also ==
- Historicity of the Book of Mormon

== Sources cited ==
- Thomas, John Christopher (2016). A Pentecostal Reads the Book of Mormon: A Literary and Theological Introduction. CPT Press. ISBN 978-1-935931-55-3. Wikidata Q123196681.

Preceded by Jacob	Nephite record keeper of the small plates Sometime between 544 B.C. and 420 B.C. - Sometime between 420 B.C. and 399 B.C.	Succeeded by Jarom
