= Amaleki =

Book of Mormon record keeper

According to the Book of Mormon, Amaleki (/əˈmæləkaɪ/) was one of several Nephite record keepers who maintained records on metal plates known as the plates of Nephi. The Book of Mormon refers to the small plates of Nephi and the large plates of Nephi. Nephi began writing on the small plates about 570 BC. Nephi's brother Jacob and his descendants began keeping records of sacred and religious matters on the small plates around 544 BC. Seven of Jacob's descendants, including Amaleki, wrote on the plates. Amaleki recorded his account on the plates about 130 BC. He states at the end of his writings that the plates are full. He received the plates of Nephi from his father Abinadom and penned 18 verses in the Book of Omni (Omni 1:12-30). He was the last person to write in the small plates of Nephi. Having no descendants, Amaleki gave the small plates to King Benjamin.

== Life ==
The Book of Mormon says Amaleki was born in Mosiah's days but does not reveal his birthplace The wording could mean Amaleki was born during Mosiah's lifetime or during Mosiah's reign as Zarahemla's king. Around 200 BC, Mosiah led a group of Nephites from the Land of Nephi northward through the wilderness to a land already populated by another migrant group. The land was called Zarahemla. The two groups joined together, and Mosiah became king of the land. Amaleki could possibly have been born in the Land of Nephi before Mosiah led a group to Zarahemla. He could also have been born in Zarahemla after Mosiah resettled his group there.

Amaleki states that he lived to see King Mosiah's death and the ascension of Mosiah's son, Benjamin, to the throne. Amaleki witnessed a war between the people of Zarahemla and the Lamanites during King Benjamin's reign. When he grew old, Amaleki had no children to pass the record-keeping responsibility to, so he turned the small plates over to King Benjamin, who continued recording on the large plates of Nephi.

== Contributions ==
After the death of Amaleki's fourth great-grandfather, Jacob, the Nephites entered political and spiritual decline. While Jacob held the priesthood and was considered a powerful spiritual leader among the Nephites, there is no indication that his descendants maintained priestly offices or extensively taught religious doctrines among the Nephites. Jacob's seven descendants put minimal effort into record keeping, writing more about warfare than religious teachings. Nonetheless, they took their obligations seriously enough to write something. Some of them expressed an obligation to preserve their family genealogy on the plates.

At 919 words (in English editions), Amaleki was the most prolific of Jacob's record-keeping descendants. Amaleki provides key events relevant to understanding the overall narrative of the Book of Mormon. Amaleki relates the flight of Mosiah I and his people from Nephi and the subsequent discovery of Zarahemla and its people. All we know about King Mosiah I comes from Amaleki. He documents the uniting of the Nephites and the People of Zarahemla. He relates that the people of Zarahemla were descendants of the Israelites. As a result of the contact between Zarahemla's people and Coriantumr, the last living Jaredite, Amaleki introduces the Jaredites for the first time in the Book of Mormon. Amaleki relates how two Nephite groups attempted to recolonize the Land of Nephi. Amaleki testified of Jesus Christ.

Gary R. Whiting writes, "Amaleki’s record in the book of Omni is a very important part of the Book of Mormon because the historical information he includes gives insight into and background for the rest of the Book of Mormon account." Terrence L. Szink writes that Amaleki is "the most significant writer in the book of Omni." Szink explains, "Not only did Amaleki write almost two-thirds of this small book, but he was the first writer in the small plates of Nephi after Enos who mentioned Christ."

== Influence ==
Bruce R. McConkie once said: "Amaleki explained that 'there is nothing which is good save it comes from the Lord: and that which is evil cometh from the devil' (Omni 1:25; see also Alma 5:40). This is the great litmus test for determining the truthfulness or rightness of a matter- does it invite and entice one to come unto God, to partake of his goodness and grace, to enjoy the fruits of his Spirit, to gain in time those godly attributes and godly powers which will equip the person to be with and be like God? If it does so, it is of God."

== Family tree ==
Lehi
Jacob
Enos
Jarom
Omni
Amaron	Chemish
Abinadom
Amaleki

Preceded by Abinadom	Nephite record keeper of the small plates Sometime after 279 BC	Succeeded by King Benjamin
