= Plates of Nephi =

Purported basis for the Book of Mormon

According to the Book of Mormon, the plates of Nephi, consisting of the large plates of Nephi and the small plates of Nephi, are a portion of the collection of inscribed metal plates which make up the record of the Nephites. This record was later abridged by Mormon and inscribed onto gold plates from which Joseph Smith translated the Book of Mormon after an angel revealed to him the location where the plates were buried on a hill called Cumorah near the town of Palmyra, New York.

Palaeographic study of the plates is not possible; according to Joseph Smith the plates were returned to an angel named Moroni, and are no longer in human possession.

== Origins ==
According to the Book of Mormon prophet Nephi: "I make an abridgment of the record of my father, upon plates which I have made with mine own hands; wherefore, after I have abridged the record of my father then will I make an account of mine own life." Nephi's father, Lehi, was also a prophet who, after prophesying of the destruction of Jerusalem, left with members of his extended family around 600 BC and was eventually directed to the New World. Nephi was commanded to make two sets of plates: A small set of plates "for the special purpose that there should be an account engraven of the ministry of my people," and "the other plates are for the more part of the reign of the kings and the wars and contentions of my people." These plates, as well as other records made and found by Nephi's people were handed down from generation to generation.

== Small plates ==
After Nephi had begun the large plates, he was instructed by the Lord to make another set of plates to record "the ministry and the prophecies, the more plain and precious parts of them." These smaller plates were kept by Nephi's descendants until about 150 BC, when the prophet Amaleki delivered the plates to Benjamin, king of Zarahemla, who "put them with the other plates, which contained records which had been handed down by the kings" (Words of Mormon 1:10). Amaleki's last writing was the statement that the small plates were full (Omni 1:30) and from this point there were no further additions to the small plates. Mormon did not abridge the small plates of Nephi but he did include them in the records he gave to his son Moroni (Words of Mormon 1:6).

The first six books of the Book of Mormon, from First Nephi to Omni are said to be a translation of the small plates of Nephi.

== Large plates ==
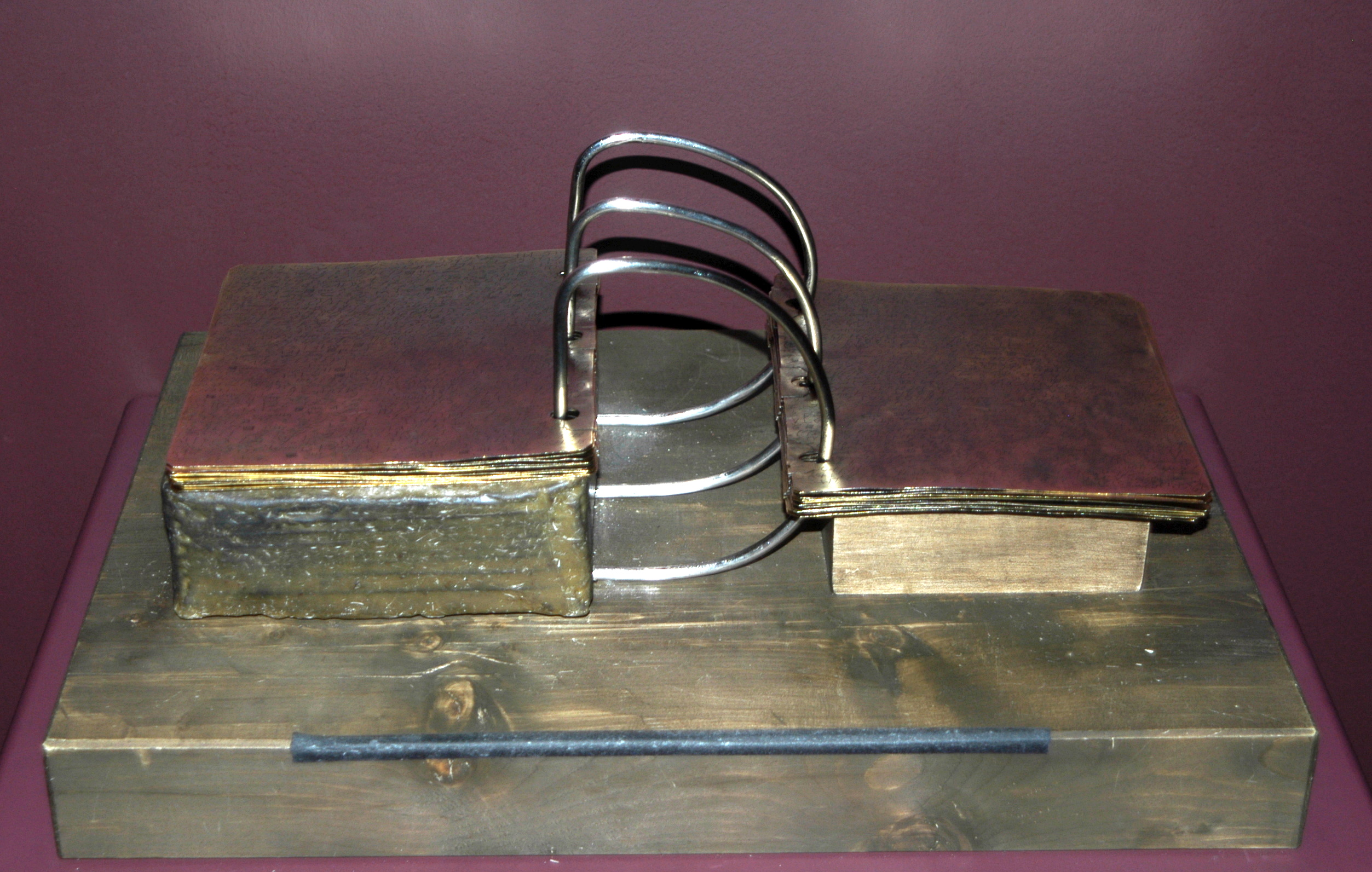
Full-scale model of the gold plates based on Joseph Smith's description

Joseph Smith said that the large plates of Nephi were continually maintained until about 385 AD, when the prophet Mormon, seeing that the destruction of the Nephite nation was imminent, abridged the large plates. This abridgement, with additions by Mormon's son Moroni, was part of the set of gold plates that Moroni, resurrected as the Angel Moroni, delivered to Joseph Smith.

The books within the Book of Mormon from The Words of Mormon to Fourth Nephi, are taken from Mormon's abridgment of the large plates. Although the large plates were intended for the more secular history of the Nephites, it is obvious from the version available in the Book of Mormon that there was a good deal of spiritual content as well, including sermons, prophecies, and moral lessons. Some periods of time are covered in more detail than others, in particular a series of wars between the Nephites and the Lamanites in the Book of Alma. Whether the uneven coverage is a reflection of the original record or is an artifact of Mormon's abridgement is unclear from the text.

=== Book of Lehi ===
While recording his own history, Nephi mentioned "the record which has been kept by my father" (1 Nephi 6:1) in a few places. Nephi also mentioned that he had made an abridgement of the record of his father at the beginning of his own record (1 Nephi 1:17).

While translating the gold plates, Joseph Smith reluctantly allowed his associate, Martin Harris, to take the entirety of the translation to that point, 116 manuscript pages, to show to Harris's wife and her family, to convince them that his (Harris's) financial support of Smith was worthwhile. Although strictly charged to ensure its safety, Harris lost the manuscript. The lost portion, which was part of the large plates of Nephi, contained Nephi's record of the ministry of his father, Lehi, and was known as The Book of Lehi. Joseph Smith recorded, in the Doctrine and Covenants (Chapter 3 and Chapter 10), that the Lord instructed him not to re-translate the portion of the book that was lost, but to continue forward.

In place of the lost Book of Lehi, the translation from the small plates of Nephi was used, which covered the same time period. Both Nephi (1 Nephi 19:3) and Mormon (Words of Mormon 1:7) recorded that the small plates were made for a "wise purpose" that was known to the Lord. The aforementioned sections of the Doctrine and Covenants (Chapter 3 and Chapter 10) state that the loss of the Book of Lehi was foreseen by the Lord and that it was for this purpose that the small plates were provided.

== Caretakers ==
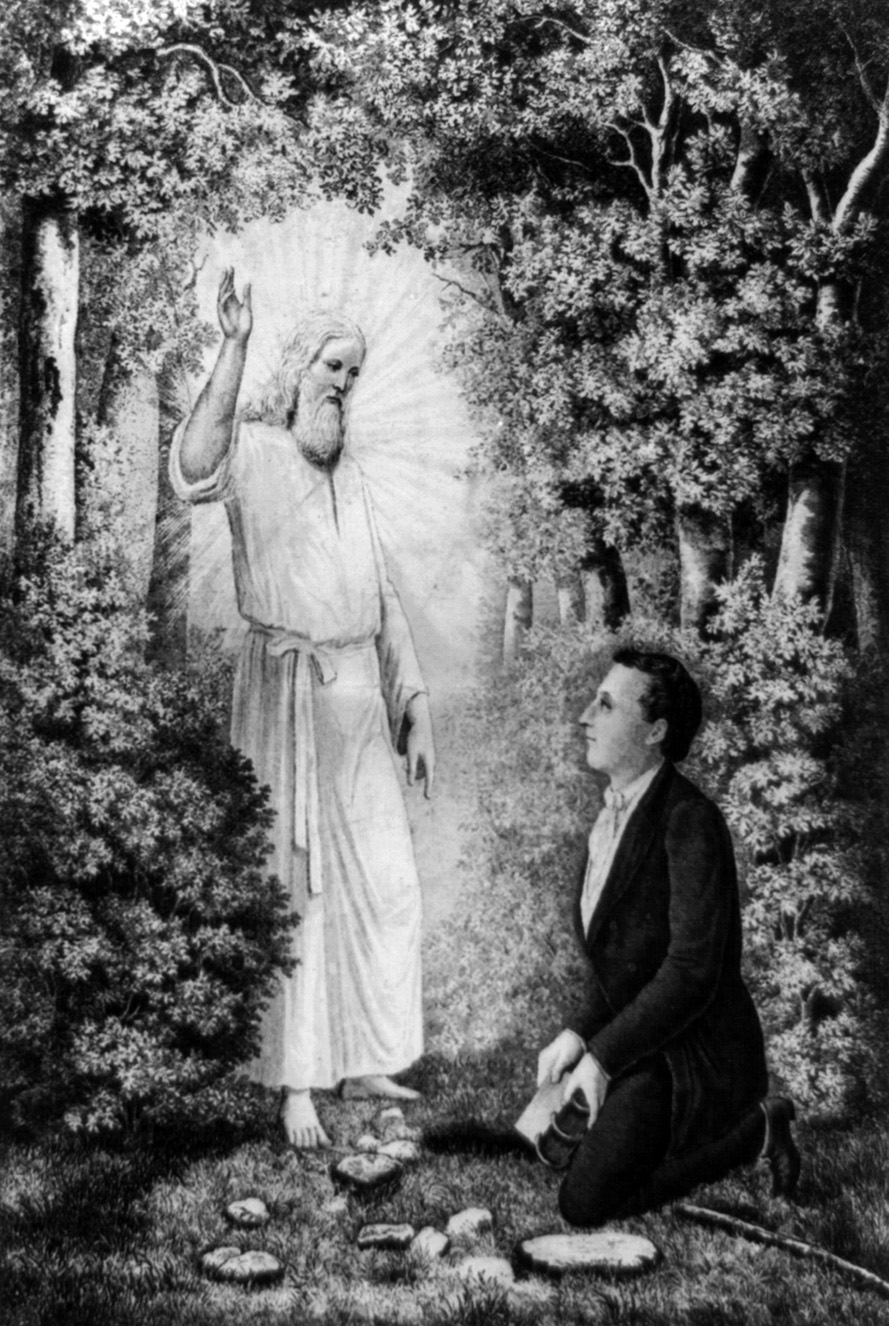
The angel Moroni delivering the plates of the Book of Mormon to Joseph Smith.

The plates of Laban, the sword of Laban, the plates of Nephi, the Liahona, the plates of Ether, other records engraved on metal plates, and at least one record engraved on stone were passed down from generation to generation. Each generation had one caretaker who was responsible for these items, mostly the records. According to the Book of Mormon, the caretakers were:

- Nephi, son of Lehi — The first caretaker of:
  - Small and Large Plates of Nephi
  - Plates and Sword of Laban — Retrieved by Nephi and his brothers in the First Book of Nephi chapters 3 & 4
  - Record of Lehi
- Jacob, son of Lehi — Nephi's brother
- Enos, son of Jacob
- Jarom, son of Enos
- Omni, son of Jarom
- Chemish, son of Omni — brother of Amaron
- Abinadom, son of Chemish
- Amaleki, son of Abinadom
  - Jaredite Record — During the time of Mosiah, the Nephites fled to the land of Zarahemla and discovered the Mulekites who had found a stone tablet with writing on it. Mosiah interpreted the writings by the power of God, and it turned out to be a record of the people of Jared, more fully recorded in the Book of Ether.
  - Amaleki was also the last to write on the Small Plates of Nephi.
- King Benjamin, son of King Mosiah — Amaleki wrote, "having no seed, and knowing king Benjamin to be a just man before the Lord, wherefore, I shall deliver up these plates unto him."
- King Mosiah, son of King Benjamin — Besides caretaking of the records, Mosiah added two sets of records returned by Ammon and the people of Zeniff:
  - The Record of Zeniff
  - Plates of Ether that had been recovered by the people of Zeniff.
- Alma son of Alma
- Helaman, son of Alma
- Shiblon, son of Alma
- Helaman, son of Helaman — nephew of Shiblon
- Nephi, son of Helaman — No record of when he became the caretaker.
- Nephi, son of Nephi
- Amos, son of Nephi
- Amos, son of Amos
- Ammaron, son of Amos — brother of Amos, son of Amos.
  - "Ammaron, being constrained by the Holy Ghost, did hide up the records which were sacred—yea, even all the sacred records which had been handed down from generation to generation, which were sacred."
- Mormon, son of Mormon
  - When Mormon was ten years old, Ammaron told him where to find the records that had been hidden.
  - Mormon waited until he was twenty-four years old (as instructed) to retrieve the records.
  - Plates of Mormon — Made his own plates where he abridged the previous records and that he later passed down to his son Moroni.
- Moroni, son of Mormon

== See also ==
- Mosiah priority
