= Ralph C. Hancock =

Ralph Cornel Hancock (born November 16, 1951) is a professor of political science at Brigham Young University (BYU).

== Biography ==
Ralph C. Hancock is Professor of Political Science at Brigham Young University, where he teaches courses on the tradition of political philosophy, contemporary political theory, and American and French political thought. Hancock holds a BA from Brigham Young University and an MA and PhD from Harvard University. Before teaching at BYU, Hancock taught at Hillsdale College and the University of Idaho. He has also served multiple times as a Visiting Professor at the University of Rennes in France and was a Visiting Scholar at Liberty Fund in Indianapolis.

Ralph Hancock is the author of Love and Virtue in a Secular Age: Christianity, Modernity, and the Human Good, The Responsibility of Reason: Theory and Practice in a Liberal-Democratic Age, and Calvin and the Foundations of Modern Politics. He is also the editor of America, the West, and Liberal Education, featuring essays by figures such as Allan Bloom and Stanley Rosen, and co-editor with Gary Lambert of The Legacy of the French Revolution. In addition, he has translated numerous works from French, including Pierre Manent’s Natural Law and Human Rights.

His scholarship focuses on the intersection of faith, reason, and politics. He has published widely in academic journals such as Perspectives on Political Science as well as in venues including Square Two, FARMS Review, First Things, the Claremont Review of Books, and Law & Liberty. He serves as a Consulting Editor for Perspectives on Political Science and sits on the editorial board of Square Two, an online journal of “Faithful Scholarship by Members of the Restored Church of Jesus Christ of Latter-day Saints on Contemporary Issues.” Hancock is also a founding partner of Fathom the Good, a home school curriculum grounded in Western moral and political philosophy and in the principles of the American Founding. He also hosts The City and the Soul series at Cwic Media.

== Sources ==
- BYU faculty profile for Hancock
- Barnes and Noble listing of works by Hancock
- Intercollegiate Studies Institute bio
- An Invitation to Political Thought Author bios, p. xvii.

== Selected translations ==
- Pierre Manent, “Why Natural Law,” Claremont Review of Books XXVI, 1 (with Daniel J. Mahoney and Paul Seaton).
- Alain Finkielkraut and Pierre Manent, The God Question, City Journal (12/8/2022)
- Pascal Bruckner, “Be My Brother, or I Will Kill You,” City Journal (9/7/2022) https://www.city-journal.org/putins-moralizing-barbarism
- Pierre Manent and Eugenie Bastie, « The Emptying of Political Life.” City Journal (5/4/2022) https://www.city-journal.org/french-politics-after-the-election
- Pierre Manent, Natural Law and Human Rights ( Notre Dame University Press 2020).
- Alain Besancon, Protestant Nation: the Fragile Christian Roots of America’s Greatness (Saint Augustine Press, 2019).
- Pierre Manent, Beyond Radical Secularism: How France and the Christian West Should Respond to the Islamic Challenge (Saint Augustine Press, 2016).
- Pierre Manent, Seeing Things Politically (Saint Augustine Press, 2015). With “Translator’s Note.”
- Alain Besancon, A Century of Horrors: On Communism, Nazism, and the Uniqueness of the Shoah (ISI Books, 2007) (with Nathaniel Hancock)
- Philippe Bénéton, Equality by Default: an Essay on Modernity as Confinement (ISI Books, 2004)
- Pierre Manent, “Reason and Faith: A Lenten Reflection,” Modern Age 50:1 (Winter 2008), 84-87.
- Andre Glucksmann, “From the H-Bomb to the Human Bomb,” City Journal 17:4 (Autumn 2007) (with John Hancock)
- Zarader, Marlène. “Phenomenality and Transcendence.” In Transcendence in Philosophy and Religion. Edited by James E. Faulconer. Bloomington: Indiana UP, 2003. 106-119. (with John and Nathaniel Hancock)
- Philippe Beneton, “The Great Misunderstanding,” ), in The Legacy of the French Revolution, ed. Ralph C. Hancock & L. Gary Lambert, Rowman & Littlefield, Lanham, Maryland, 1996, 175-185. (Trans. with P. Beneton)
- Pierre Manent, “The French Revolution and French and English Liberalism,” ), in The Legacy of the French Revolution, ed. Ralph C. Hancock & L. Gary Lambert, Rowman & Littlefield, Lanham, Maryland, 1996, 43-78. (Trans. with L. Gary Lambert)
- Philippe Raynaud, “The ‘Rights of Man and Citizen’ in the French Constitutional Tradition,” ), in The Legacy of the French Revolution, ed. Ralph C. Hancock & L. Gary Lambert, Rowman & Littlefield, Lanham, Maryland, 1996, 199-218. (Trans. with L. Gary Lambert)
