= Jarom =

Prophet in the Book of Mormon

In the Book of Mormon, Jarom (/ˈdʒærəm/) is a Nephite prophet, the son of the prophet Enos. Jarom narrates the Book of Jarom, which comprises 15 verses in the Book of Mormon.

== Family tree ==
Jacob
Enos
Jarom
Omni
Amaron	Chemish
Abinadom
Amaleki

== Writings ==
Jarom relates that he received "revelations" and prophesied, and that there would be many wars between the two Book of Mormon peoples the Nephites and the Lamanites. Before his death, record keeping was handed over to his son Omni.

== See also ==
- Plates of Nephi: Caretakers

Preceded by Enos	Nephite record keeper of the small plates Sometime before 399 BC – Sometime before 323 BC	Succeeded by Omni
