= Grant Hardy =

American historian

Grant R. Hardy
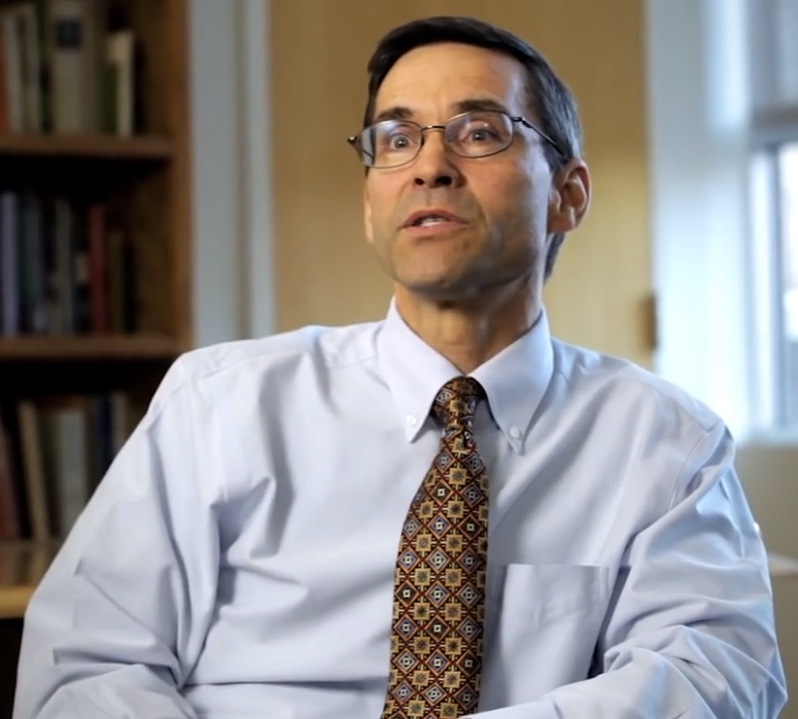
- Born: Chicago
- Education: Brigham Young University (BA); Yale University (PhD)
- Occupation: Professor
- Employer: University of North Carolina at Asheville (1994–present)
- Known for: Book of Mormon studies
- Spouse: Heather Nielsen Hardy
- Website: history.unca.edu/faces/faculty/grant-hardy

Grant Hardy is professor of history and religious studies and former director of the humanities program at the University of North Carolina at Asheville. He earned his BA in ancient Greek in 1984 from Brigham Young University and his PhD in Chinese language and literature from Yale University in 1988. Having written, cowritten, or edited several books in the fields of history, humanities, and religious texts as literature, Hardy is known for literary studies of the Book of Mormon.

== Chinese Language and Literature Studies ==
Hardy has a PhD in Chinese language and literature from Yale University. Starting at nineteen years of age, he served a two-year Mandarin-speaking religious mission for the Church of Jesus Christ of Latter-day Saints (LDS Church) in Taichung, Taiwan.

== Mormon studies ==
=== Book of Mormon study editions and notes ===
Hardy's contributions in Mormon studies are The Book of Mormon: A Reader's Edition (2003), Understanding the Book of Mormon: A Readers' Guide (2010), The Book of Mormon: Another Testament of Jesus Christ: Maxwell Institute Study Edition, (2018), and The Annotated Book of Mormon (2023).

==== Reception ====
Individual works

According to a review by Michael Austin of The Book of Mormon: Another Testament of Jesus Christ, Maxwell Institute Study Edition (2018; Hardy, ed.), "By combining with a serious and thoughtful scholar like Grant Hardy, the [LDS] Church has produced and authorized a version of its signature scripture that is orders of magnitude more helpful, and more scholarly, than anything it has produced before."

Hardy's Understanding the Book of Mormon (2010) has been received favorably for what its publisher, Oxford University Press, describes as "comprehensive analysis of the work's narrative structure."

In August 2023, Prof. Hardy's "The Annotated Book of Mormon" was released. It is a fully annotated version of the BoM in the style of the New Oxford Annotated Bible. In introducing his interview with Hardy concerning this work, host Jack Dugan called him one of the preeminent scholars of the history and theology of the LDS Church.

In general

Grant Shreve says the Book of Mormon's text, "once derided as 'a fiction of hob-goblins and bugbears,'" now is being examined by non-Mormon academics and university students, its inclusion on syllabi facilitated by "attractive reader’s editions of the Book of Mormon armed with immaculate scholarly introductions framing it for non-Mormon audiences" by Hardy (2005) and also by Laurie Maffly-Kipp (2008, Penguin).

In the Mormon apologetics journal Interpreter, Neal Rappleye lauds Hardy's demonstrations of the Book of Mormon's "depth and complexity, multiple voices, and insightful readings," that bolsters its truth claims according to Rappleye.

In April 2016, the Journal of Book of Mormon Studies devoted an issue to Hardy's Book of Mormon studies, its editor saying, "We see his work as crucially transitional, bringing the scripture increasingly to the attention of the broader academy."

=== Apologetics ===
Hardy, who is a member of the LDS Church, has joined proponents advocating tolerance within the faith for struggles with doubt. Providing context for his work, in his 5 August 2016 address at the annual FairMormon conference, he said, "Academics have little interest in debates about whether Mormonism is true or false, but they are increasingly interested in Mormonism as a religious and social movement." When asked during the question-and-answer session concerning believers who harbor questions about the Book of Mormon's historicity, he said, "Can faith in the Book of Mormon as inspired fiction be a saving faith? And I think the answer is, absolutely."

A two-part 2017 article by Duane Boyce in the LDS apologetics journal Interpreter questions the didactic effectiveness of Hardy's study's ascriptions of possible psychological motives to individuals categorized as prophets within the Book of Mormon. Boyce believes literary analysis of this type detracts from the book's divine purpose. Ralph C. Hancock published in Interpreter his argument that Hardy’s reading of the Book of Mormon is "in a way more religious than any other because it is more rational—that is, by allowing natural questions to arise and to resonate, he reveals characters to us (especially the three authors" [Nephi, Mormon, and Moroni] "that are more miraculous because they are more human."

=== Background: Opening the Book of Mormon studies sub-discipline ===
Studies of the Book of Mormon—the foundational scripture of the Latter-day Saints—usually were apologetic (devotional) or polemical (critical of its truth claims) prior to about 2010. Paralleling the burgeoning of Mormon studies generally as a field of more neutral scholarship in early twenty-first century, university courses began including literary studies of this book.

In 2016, Nicholas J. Frederick said, "With a few notable exceptions, such as Philip Barlow’s Mormons and the Bible and Grant Hardy’s Understanding the Book of Mormon, full-length monographs devoted to [Book of Mormon studies] have been lacking." In 2017, organizers of a Book of Mormon studies symposium said, "Grant Hardy has introduced the content and the depth of the Book of Mormon into the larger academic world."

== Publications ==
=== Books ===
In addition to chapters and journal articles, Hardy has published the following books:

- Grant Hardy (1 September 2023). The Annotated Book of Mormon. Oxford University Press. ISBN 978-0-19-0082208.
- Understanding the Book of Mormon: A Readers' Guide. Oxford University Press. 2010. ISBN 978-0-19-974544-9.
- Grant Hardy, ed. (2003). The Book of Mormon: A Reader's Edition. University of Illinois Press.
- Grant Hardy; Anne Behnke Kinney (2005). The Establishment of the Han Empire and Imperial China. Greenwood Guides to Historic Events of the Ancient World. Greenwood Publishing Group. ISBN 978-0-313-32588-5.
- Worlds of Bronze and Bamboo: Sima Qian's Conquest of History. Columbia University Press. 1999. ISBN 978-0-231-50451-5.

=== Chapter ===
- Andrew Feldherr, ed. (2015). Beginnings to AD 600. Oxford History of Historical Writing. Vol. 1. Oxford University Press.
- Hardy, Grant (2018). "Textual Criticism and the Book of Mormon". In Mark Ashurst-McGee; Robin Scott Jensen; Sharalyn D. Howcroft (eds.). Foundational Texts of Mormonism. Oxford University Press. pp. 37–73. ISBN 978-0-19-0274405.

== Multimedia ==
- Sacred Texts of the World (Audio of 36 lectures as narrated by Grant Hardy). The Great Courses. Teaching Company. 2013. ISBN 978-1-62997-044-8.
- Great Minds of the Eastern Intellectual Tradition. The Great Courses. Teaching Company. 2011. ISBN 978-1-59803-742-5.

== See also ==
- Origin of the Book of Mormon
