= Jacob (Book of Mormon prophet) =

Book of Mormon character

In the Book of Mormon, Jacob (Hebrew: יַעֲקֹב, romanized: Yaʿakov) is a younger brother of the prophet Nephi, the keeper of the small plates of Nephi after Nephi's death, and narrates the Book of Jacob, which in the frame narrative of the overall Book of Mormon he authors.

== Family ==
The Book of Mormon mentions Jacob as the younger brother of Nephi, and the elder of two sons born to Lehi (the younger son being Joseph) after Lehi's departure from Jerusalem. It does not explicitly name Lehi's wife Sariah as the mother of Jacob or Joseph, but no other wife of Lehi is ever mentioned.

Lehi	Sariah
Laman	Lemuel	Sam	Nephi	Jacob	Joseph

== Life ==
According to the Book of Mormon narrative, Jacob was born in the wilderness during his father Lehi's journey from Jerusalem to the promised land (the Americas) sometime between 592 BC and 590 BC.

Jacob and his family eventually traveled to the Americas via boat constructed by his brother, Nephi. Jacob went on to be a righteous leader, and succeeded Nephi as prophet to the Nephites. Jacob is the author of the Book of Jacob in the Book of Mormon.

== Teachings ==
Three sermons of Jacob are recorded in the Book of Mormon which include preaching of central as well as specific doctrinal truths. In them, Jacob preaches many core LDS doctrines, including humanity's fallen nature and subsequent need of an infinite atonement, the salvation of repentant individuals through the Atonement of Christ, and so forth. He also sternly and definitely preaches against specific practices such as pride, racism, and polygyny (excepting only when commanded by the Lord so as to "raise up a people unto me"). Jacob also speaks favorably of the blessings associated with humble righteousness, such as the bright future of the Lamanite people due to their marital and familial love for each other.

The first sermon draws on Isaiah's teachings to invite individuals and nations to return from rejecting Christ and receive His mercies. He clarifies sin as knowing God's commandments and doing otherwise, and offers the generous doctrine that "where there is no law given there is no punishment[,] no condemnation[,] and the mercies of the Holy One of Israel have claim upon them, because of the atonement; for they are delivered by the power of him."

In his second sermon, Jacob decries pride, greed and lust. He upends racist Nephite self-righteousness, saying of the Lamanites, who were ignorant of the finer points of the law, "their husbands love their wives, and their wives love their husbands; and their husbands and their wives love their children" and prophesies that the Lord would be merciful to the Lamanites because of their righteousness in this regard. He explained the Lord's standard of sexual purity as "that they should have save it were one wife, and concubines they should have none, and there should not be whoredoms committed among them" unless directed by God via revelation for the purpose of "rais[ing] up seed unto me".

In Jacob's third sermon, Jacob quotes an allegory of the scattering and gathering of Israel (see Parable of the Olive Tree), which he attributes to another prophet, Zenos. In it, what may have been perceived as the Lord's punishment is re-framed as the Lord's devoted effort to save His original covenant people, as well as to spread his covenant and the blessings that accompany it, to all other nations. Christ is seen as a mediator, calling on the Master of the Vineyard to forbear casting the wicked "into the fire", saying instead "Let us prune it, and dig about it, and nourish it a little longer". Lest the Lord of the Vineyard's mercy be questioned, the allegory later records that "the Lord of the vineyard wept, and said unto the servant: What could I have done more for my vineyard?... Have I slackened mine hand, that I have not nourished it? Nay, I have nourished it, and I have digged about it, and I have pruned it, and I have dunged it; and I have stretched forth mine hand almost all the day long, and the end draweth nigh. And it grieveth me that I should hew down all the trees of my vineyard, and cast them into the fire that they should be burned."

== Notable descendants ==
According to the Book of Mormon, several important record keepers were direct descendants of Jacob as shown below:

Jacob
Enos
Jarom
Omni
Amaron	Chemish
Abinadom
Amaleki

Preceded by Nephi	Nephite record keeper of the small plates 544 BC - Sometime before 420 BC	Succeeded by Enos
