= Lamanites =

People mentioned in the Book of Mormon

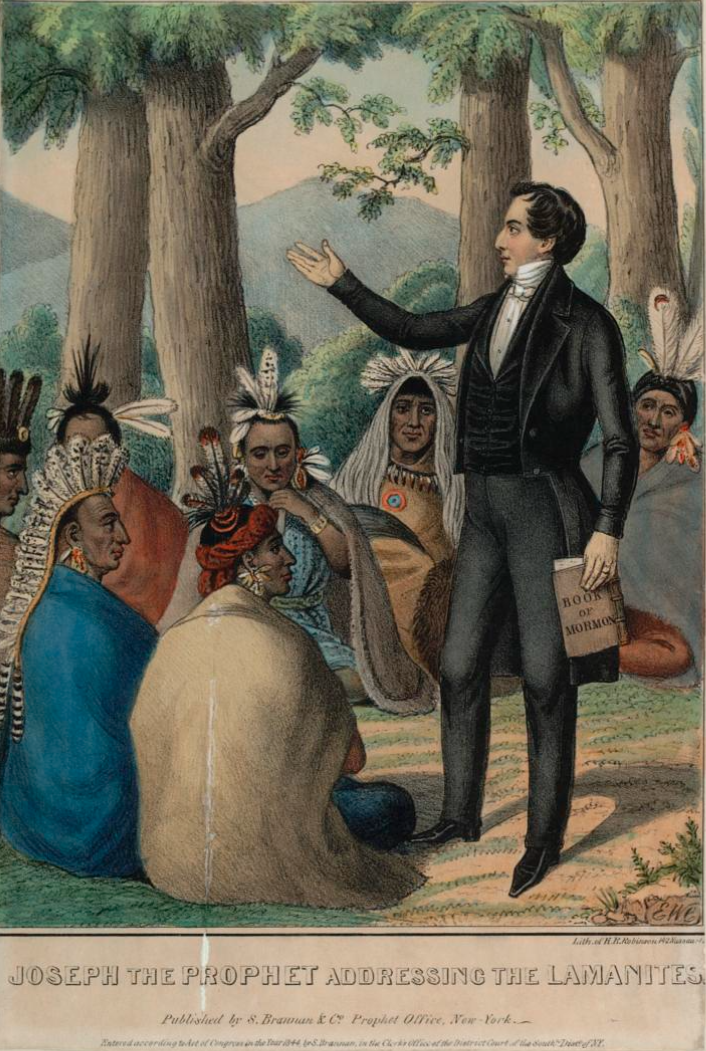
Lithograph of Joseph Smith addressing a delegation of Native Americans visiting Nauvoo, whom he referred to as Lamanites

The Lamanites (/ˈleɪmənaɪt/) (Note: IPA-ified from «lā´mun-īt») are a people described in the Book of Mormon. They also appear in other scriptures and teachings of the Latter Day Saint movement. They are portrayed as descendants of Laman, the eldest son of Lehi, and as longstanding rivals of the Nephites, whose civilization they ultimately destroyed.

The Doctrine and Covenants records revelations directing early Latter Day Saint missionaries to preach to the Lamanites. Historically, Latter Day Saints identified them primarily with Native Americans, later extending the concept to include many Polynesians. Since the late twentieth century, official publications of the movement's largest denomination, the Church of Jesus Christ of Latter-day Saints (LDS Church), have adopted more limited statements about their relationship to Indigenous peoples of the Americas.

The Book of Mormon's descriptions of the Lamanites, particularly those concerning skin color and divine cursing, have influenced Latter Day Saint teachings on race and have been the subject of scholarly discussion and reinterpretation.

== Book of Mormon narrative ==
According to the Book of Mormon, the family of Lehi, described as a wealthy Hebrew prophet, the family of Ishmael, and Zoram traveled from the Middle East to the Americas by boat in around 600 BC. In his dying blessings to his children, Lehi assigns tribes to his descendants, usually named after the son whose family made up the tribe: Nephites, Jacobites, Josephites, Zoramites, Lamanites, Lemuelites, and Ishmaelites after Nephi, Joseph, Zoram, Laman, and Lemuel. Lehi's son Sam is included in the Nephites, his sons-in-law are presumably included together in the Ishmaelites, and Zoram was not Lehi's son, but his family travelled with Lehi's family. In 2 Nephi 5, the narrative divides the people into Nephites and Lamanites; in his book The Testimony of Two Nations, Michael Austin interprets these as categories of convenience for the sake of the narrative, similar to how the twelve tribes of Israel are divided into the Kingdom of Israel and the Kingdom of Judah in the Old Testament.

After the two groups separated from each other, the rebellious Lamanites were cursed and "cut off from the presence of the Lord." They received a "skin of blackness" so they would "not be enticing" to the Nephites. Centuries later, the narrative in the Book of Alma still describes the skin of the Lamanites as "dark."

The Book of Mormon describes the animosity the Lamanite people held toward the Nephites. The Lamanites believed they were "driven out of the land of Jerusalem because of the iniquities of their fathers" and were wronged by Nephi and so swore vengeance against his descendants. The Lamanites taught their children to have "eternal hatred" towards the Nephites, and "that they should murder them, and that they should rob and plunder them, and do all they could to destroy them."

After the two groups warred for centuries, the narrative states that Jesus Christ appeared to the more righteous Nephites and the Lamanites, who, by then, had converted in large numbers to righteousness before God. Soon after his visit, the Lamanites and Nephites merged into one nation and co-existed for two centuries in peace. The Book of Mormon further recounts, "There were no robbers, nor murderers, neither were there Lamanites, nor any manner of -ites; but they were in one, the children of Christ, and heirs to the kingdom of God."

However, 84 years after the coming of Christ, "a small part of the people who had revolted from the church" started calling themselves Lamanites again. Those who remained were again identified as Nephites, but both groups were reported to have fallen into apostasy. The reestablished Lamanites and Nephites were largely distinguished by ideological choices rather than by previous ethnic distinctions. The Book of Mormon recounts a series of large battles over two centuries, ending with the extermination of the Nephites by the Lamanites.

== Doctrine and Covenants ==
The Doctrine and Covenants is composed of writings that adherents in the Latter Day Saint movement believe to be revelations from God. It is considered scripture in the sacred text of the Latter Day Saint movement and says that God called Oliver Cowdery (D&C 28:8) and later Peter Whitmer and Parley P. Pratt (D&C 32:1–2) to teach the gospel to the Lamanites. Cowdery is given the power to build up God's church among them (D&C 30:6). The men believed that God was referring to the Native Americans and began teaching among the Lenape.

== Proposed modern descendants ==
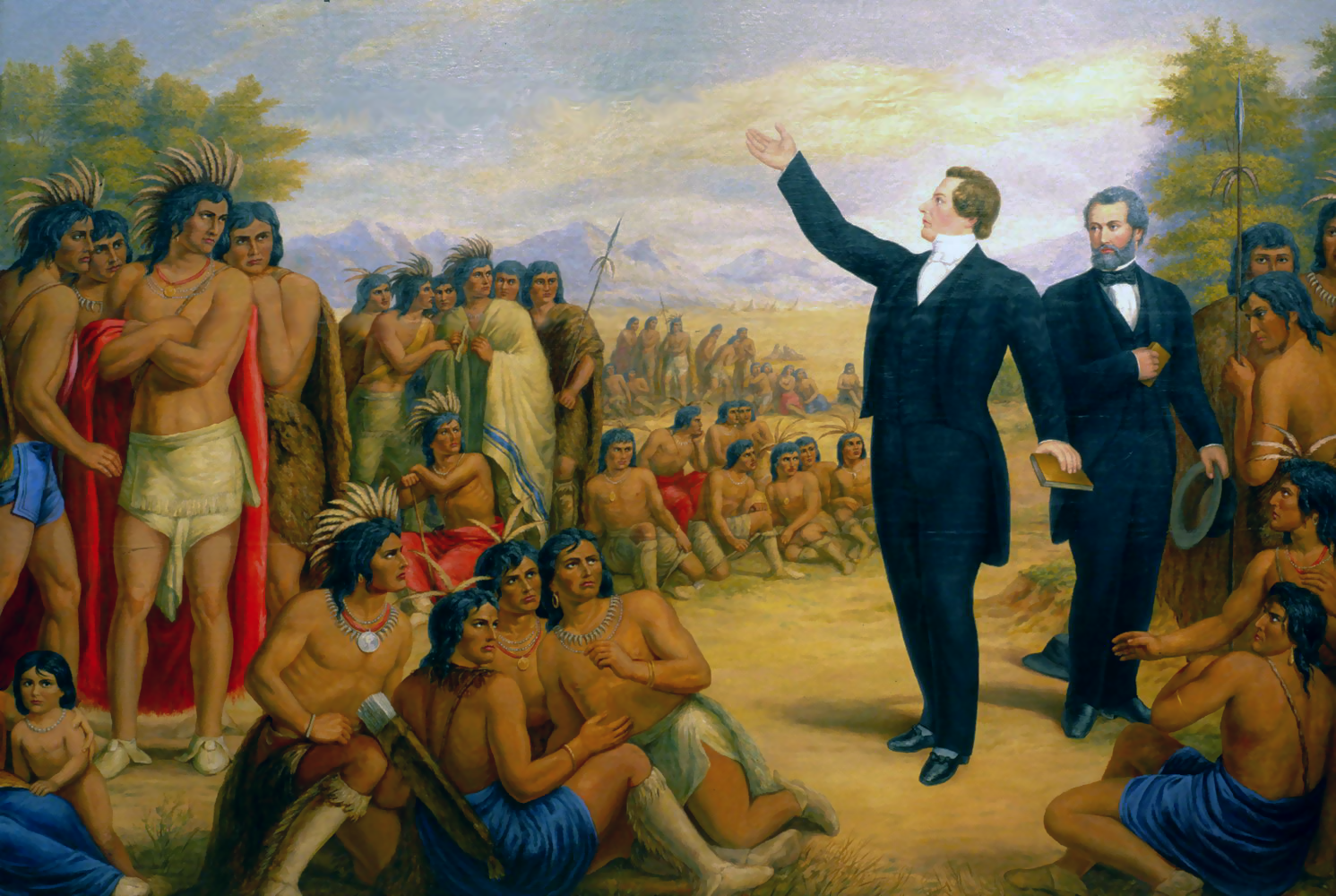
Joseph Smith preaching to the Sac and Fox Indians who visited Nauvoo, Illinois, on August 12, 1841.

Historically, Mormons have identified the Lamanites as the primary ancestors of the North American Native Americans.

=== Teachings in the 1800s ===
Early Mormons expected large numbers of Native American converts, who would teach gentiles how to interpret scripture, according to a revelation given to Joseph Smith in May 1829. In the Book of Mormon, Jesus told people in the New World that conversion would precede the millennium, and members interpreted this promise as one referring to Lamanites, and by extension, Native Americans. These Native American converts would work alongside other members as partners in building Zion. After the failure of early missions to Indigenous peoples, Smith focused on building Zion without the cooperation of "Lamanite" people. The concept began to expand to include all Indigenous peoples of the Americas.

=== Teachings in the 1900s ===
Twentieth century teachings connecting modern Native Americans and Lamanites reached their height under the presidency of Spencer W. Kimball (1973 –1985), then declined, but did not disappear. For example, in 1967, then apostle (later church president) Kimball stated that Native Americans were descendants of Middle Eastern settlers who traveled over the ocean, and were "not Orientals" of East Asian origin, further quoting a previous First Presidency proclamation which said God, "has revealed the origin and the records of the aboriginal tribes of America, and their future destiny.-And we know it." During the time many Polynesian people converted, the concept expanded to include them as well. The scriptural account of Hagoth was used to justify the connection. Kimball definitively stated in 1971, "The term Lamanite includes all Indians and Indian mixtures, such as the Polynesians ...." and, "the Lamanites number about sixty million; they are in all of the states of America from Tierra del Fuego all the way up to Point Barrows, and they are in nearly all the islands of the sea from Hawaii south to southern New Zealand." The 1981 edition of the Book of Mormon said Lamanites "are the principal ancestors of the American Indians".

=== Teachings in the 2000s ===
The existence of a Lamanite population has received no support in mainstream science or archaeology. Genetic studies indicate that the Indigenous Americans are related to the present populations in Mongolia, Siberia, and the vicinity, and Polynesians to those in Southeast Asia.

In the twenty-first century, LDS Church outlets have stated that "[n]othing in the Book of Mormon precludes migration into the Americas by peoples of Asiatic origin". The 1981 edition introduction to the Book of Mormon was changed in 2006 from stating Lamanites "are the principal ancestors of" to "are among the ancestors of the American Indians."

Apologetics seeking to maintain relatively orthodox understandings of the Book of Mormon's depiction of Lamanites while recognizing the findings of modern genetic studies—some of which were publicized by the LDS Church at the turn of the twenty-first century—argued that DNA findings invalidated not the existence of Book of Mormon peoples per se but the presumption that they were a hemispheric society. This has involved supposing that Nephites and Lamanites dwelled in only part of the Americas while genetically identified ancestors of Indigenous peoples occupied the rest.

== Impact on views on race ==
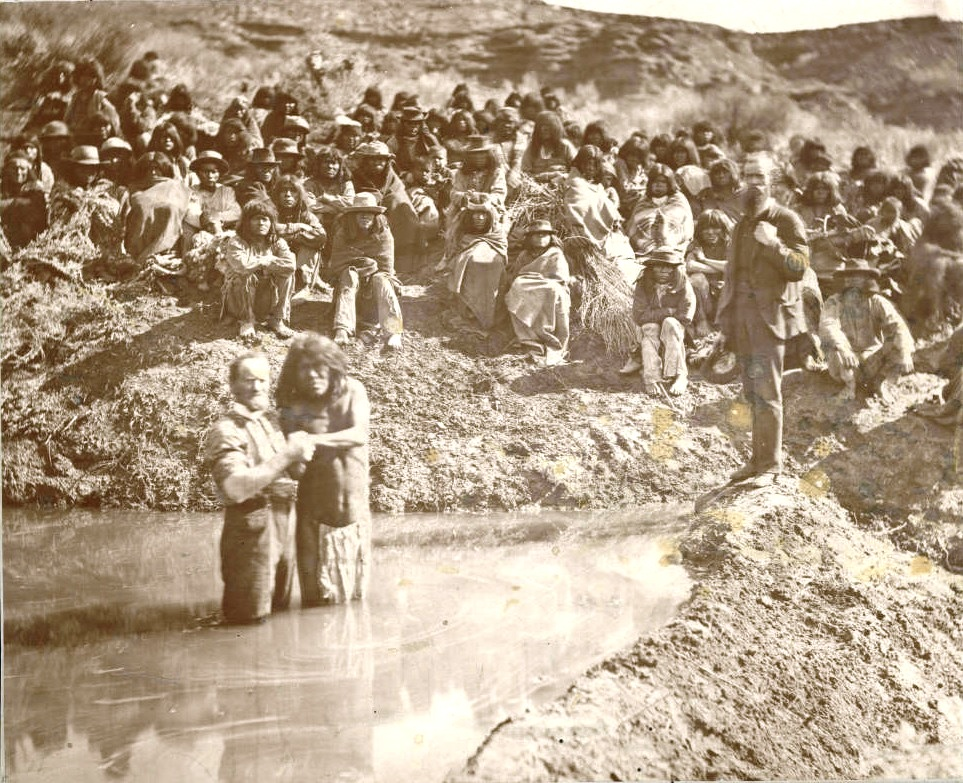
Member of the Shivwits Band of Paiutes, in 1875, being baptized by Mormon missionaries.

In the Book of Mormon, Lamanites are described as having received a "skin of blackness" to distinguish them from the Nephites. The "change" in skin color is often mentioned in conjunction with God's curse on the descendants of Laman for their wickedness and corruption:

And he had caused the cursing to come upon [the Lamanites], yea, even a sore cursing, because of their iniquity. For behold, they had hardened their hearts against him, and they had become like unto a flint; wherefore, as they were white, and exceedingly fair and delightsome, that they might not be enticing unto my people the Lord God did cause a skin of blackness to come upon them.

On the other hand, the Book of Mormon teaches that skin color is not a bar to salvation and that God:

denieth none that come unto him, black and white, bond and free, male and female; and he remembereth the heathen; and all are alike unto God, both Jew and Gentile.

The non-canonical 1981 footnote text of the Book of Mormon closely linked the concept of "skin of blackness" with that of "scales of darkness falling from their eyes," which suggests that the LDS Church has now interpreted both cases as being examples of figurative language.

Several Book of Mormon passages have been interpreted by some Latter Day Saints as indicating that Lamanites would revert to a lighter skin tone upon accepting the gospel. For example, at a 1960 LDS Church General Conference, apostle Spencer W. Kimball suggested that the skin of Latter-day Saint Native American was gradually turning lighter:

I saw a striking contrast in the progress of the Indian people today. ... The day of the Lamanites is nigh. For years they have been growing delightsome, and they are now becoming white and delightsome, as they were promised. In this picture of the twenty Lamanite missionaries, fifteen of the twenty were as light as Anglos, five were darker but equally delightsome. The children in the home placement program in Utah are often lighter than their brothers and sisters in the hogans on the reservation. At one meeting, a father and mother and their sixteen-year-old daughter we represent, the little member girl – sixteen – sitting between the dark father and mother, and it was evident she was several shades lighter than her parents – on the same reservation, in the same hogan, subject to the same sun and wind and weather. ... These young members of the Church are changing to whiteness and to delightsomeness. One white elder jokingly said that he and his companion were donating blood regularly to the hospital in the hope that the process might be accelerated.

That view was buoyed by passages such as 2 Nephi 30:6, which in early editions of the Book of Mormon, read:

[T]heir scales of darkness shall begin to fall from their eyes; and many generations shall not pass away among them, save they shall be a white and a delightsome people.

In 1840, with the third edition of the Book of Mormon, the founder of the Latter Day Saint movement, Joseph Smith, whose adherents believe translated the writings of ancient prophets to become the Book of Mormon, changed the wording to "a pure and a delightsome people," consistent with contemporary interpretation of the term "white" as used in scripture. However, all future LDS Church printings of the Book of Mormon until 1981 continued from the second edition, saying the Lamanites would become "a white and delightsome people." (Note: The 1841 and 1849 European editions (printed by the Twelve Apostles) were the Kirtland second edition with British spellings. Future LDS editions continued from the European editions until a major reworking in 1981, which adopted Smith's 1840 edit.)

Eventually in the Book of Mormon narrative, the labels "Nephite" and "Lamanite" became terms of political convenience, and membership was both varied and fluid and not based on skin color. Within the first 200 years of the Nephites' 1,000 year chronology, the prophet Jacob stated that any who were enemies of his people were called Lamanites and that any who were friends were called Nephites:

But I, Jacob, shall not hereafter distinguish them by these names, but I shall call them Lamanites that seek to destroy the people of Nephi, and those who are friendly to Nephi I shall call Nephites, or the people of Nephi, according to the reigns of the kings.

=== Anti-Lamanite narrator bias ===
Book of Mormon scholars have used various lenses to interpret how race is portrayed in the Book of Mormon, particularly in relation to the Lamanites. Throughout the book, Nephite narrators describe the Lamanites as a "wild", "ferocious", and "bloodthirsty people" who "loved murder". As Grant Hardy, Jared Hickman, Elizabeth Fenton, and Terryl Givens explain, the Book of Mormon's first-person narration means its content is couched in "limited, human perspectives". The Nephite narrators of the Book of Mormon had the power to "characterize their antagonists [the Lamanites] as they wished", Armand Mauss writes. Deidre Green, a professor of Mormon studies, suggests that the prophet Jacob condemns the Nephites' racist attitudes towards the Lamanite people and "clarifies that righteousness is manifest through right intentions and actions, not physical appearance." Michael Austin argues that Jacob's warning to the Nephite people concerning their prejudice against the Lamanites is one of the book's attempts to combat the "anti-Lamanite" biases presented by the individual narrators. Austin further supports Max Perry Mueller's assertion that the narrative of the Book of Mormon does not support anti-Lamanite prejudices, using the story of Samuel the Lamanite as an example of criticism in the book's narrative of Nephite tendencies to "link skin color to righteousness".

=== Book of Mormon chapter summaries ===
In December 2010, the LDS Church made changes to the non-canonical chapter summaries and to some of the footnotes in its online version of the Book of Mormon. In Second Nephi 5, the original wording was the following: "Because of their unbelief, the Lamanites are cursed, receive a skin of blackness, and become a scourge unto the Nephites." The phrase "skin of blackness" and the passage was changed to "Because of their unbelief, the Lamanites are cut off from the presence of the Lord, are cursed, and become a scourge unto the Nephites." The second change appears in the summary of Mormon 5. Formerly, it included the phrase that "the Lamanites shall be a dark, filthy, and loathsome people." The new version deleted the phrase "dark, loathsome, and filthy" and now reads "the Lamanites will be scattered, and the Spirit will cease to strive with them."

The changes are seen by some critics to be another step in the evolution of the text of the Book of Mormon to delete racist language from it. Others, such as Marvin Perkins, see the changes as better conforming the chapter headers and footnotes to the meaning of the text in light of the LDS Church's 1978 Revelation on Priesthood. In an interview, a former Brigham Young University graduate student suggested that the changes were made for "clarity, a change in emphasis and to stick closer to the scriptural language".

== See also ==
- House of Joseph (LDS Church)
- Gathering (LDS Church)
- Historical authenticity of the Book of Mormon
- Native American people and Mormonism
- Mound Builders#Pseudoarchaeology
- People of Ammon
- Samuel the Lamanite
- Zelph

== Sources ==
- Austin, Michael (2024). The Testimony of Two Nations: How the Book of Mormon Reads, and Rereads, the Bible. University of Illinois Press. ISBN 978-0-252-08747-9. Wikidata Q123671090.
- Coviello, Peter (2019). Make Yourselves Gods: Mormons and the Unfinished Business of American Secularism. University of Chicago Press. doi:10.7208/CHICAGO/9780226474472.001.0001. ISBN 978-0-226-47433-5. Wikidata Q124691325.
- Duffy, John-Charles (October 2008). "Mapping Book of Mormon Historicity Debates Part I: A Guide for the Overwhelmed". Sunstone.
- Givens, Terryl (2002). By the Hand of Mormon: The American scripture that launched a new world religion. Oxford University Press.
- Givens, Terryl L. (2009). The Book of Mormon: A Very Short Introduction. Oxford University Press. doi:10.1093/ACTRADE/9780195369311.001.0001. ISBN 978-0-19-936567-8. Wikidata Q114004901.
- Mauss, Armand L. (2003). All Abraham's Children: Changing Mormon Conceptions of Race and Lineage. University of Illinois Press. ISBN 978-0-252-09183-4. Wikidata Q124538725.
- Peterson, Daniel C. (2003). Largey, Dennis L.; Arnold, Marilyn; Ball, Terry B.; Dahl, Larry E.; Parry, Donald W.; Seely, David R.; Williams, Clyde J. (eds.). Book of Mormon Reference Companion. Deseret Book Company. ISBN 1-57345-231-9. Wikidata Q123364479.
- Thomas, John Christopher (2016). A Pentecostal Reads the Book of Mormon: A Literary and Theological Introduction. CPT Press. ISBN 978-1-935931-55-3. Wikidata Q123196681.
