= Nephi, son of Lehi =

Book of Mormon prophet

Nephi
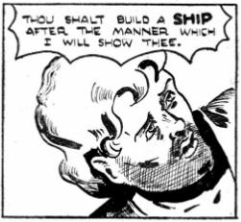
- Nephi commanded to build a ship (1948). Comic by John Philip Dalby.

Personal life
- Born: Jerusalem, Kingdom of Judah
- Died: Land of Nephi, The Americas
- Parents: Lehi (father); Sariah (mother)
- Notable works: 1 Nephi; 2 Nephi
- Relatives: Laman and Lemuel (brothers); Sam (brother); Jacob (brother); Joseph (brother); Mormon (descendant); Moroni (descendant)

Religious life
- Founder of: Nephites

Nephi (/ˈniːˌfaɪ/) is one of the central figures described in the Book of Mormon. In the Latter Day Saint movement, he is described as the son of Lehi, a prophet, and the founder of the Nephite people. The Book of Mormon also describes him as the author of its first two books, First and Second Nephi.

In the narrative, Nephi's family flees Jerusalem as commanded by God but returns twice. The first time, Lehi's sons return to retrieve the brass plates from a man named Laban. After two unsuccessful attempts to get the plates, Nephi, prompted by the Holy Spirit, kills Laban and receives the plates after disguising himself as Laban. The next time they return, the brothers convince Ishmael's family to join them. Both times Nephi's life is threatened by two of his older brothers, Laman and Lemuel.

After spending eight years in the wilderness, the family reaches the land Bountiful, where Nephi builds a ship under the direction of God. As the family voyages across the sea, Laman and Lemuel rebel, tying Nephi when he admonishes them about their behavior. A storm pushes them back on their journey, and eventually Laman and Lemuel untie him. Some time after their arrival in the Promised Land, Laman and Lemuel once again try to kill Nephi and he flees with several members of the family. Now safe, Nephi becomes a leader over his people and builds a prosperous community. Nephi is the subject of religious scholarship and various creative authorial works.

== Background and family ==
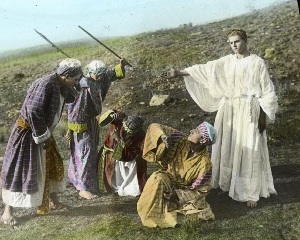
Still from The Life of Nephi (1915)

According to the Book of Mormon, Nephi is the fourth of six sons of Lehi and Sariah. Nephi and his family live in Jerusalem, circa 600 BC, during the reign of King Zedekiah, who is initiated as king under the direction of Nebuchadnezzar. They live there until Lehi is commanded by God to take his family and flee into the wilderness. Before their flight, Nephi's father Lehi prophesies of the impending destruction and captivity of Jerusalem by the armies of Babylon, an event mentioned in the Bible several times.

=== Family tree ===
Lehi	Sariah
Laman	Lemuel	Sam	Nephi	Jacob	Joseph

Nephi also mentions having sisters, though he does not give their names or birth orders. Little is known about Nephi's children. Religious scholar Grant Hardy suggests that all of Nephi's children may have been daughters at the time of passing on the record, or that his sons were influenced by Laman and Lemuel; his speculations are based on the fact that Nephi says he has children yet passes the record on to his brother Jacob.

== Narrative ==
In the narrative of the Book of Nephi, Nephi and his family leave Jerusalem around 600 BC, travel to the Red Sea, and journey three days farther into the wilderness, stopping in a valley by a river near the Red Sea. Lehi then sends four sons (Laman, Lemuel, Sam, and Nephi) back to Jerusalem to get the brass plates. After successfully obtaining them, they are commanded to return to Jerusalem a second time to bring Ishmael's family.

=== Returning to Jerusalem ===
A powerful man named Laban, who is a kinsman to Lehi, possesses the brass plates, a record kept by the Jews which contains their laws, customs, history, and lineage. Nephi and his brothers attempt three times to get them from Laban. First, they send Laman, whom Laban accuses of theft and sends servants to kill when he asks for the plates. Nephi convinces his brothers to try buying the plates using their abandoned wealth; Laban refuses the offer, though he keeps the goods, and sends his servants to kill them. After running away, the brothers hide in a cave, where Laman and Lemuel beat Nephi and Sam. An angel appears and stops them. Nephi returns a third time to make a final attempt to get the plates. When Nephi finds Laban drunk and passed out in the street, the Lord commands him to kill Laban—an idea Nephi struggles with. The Spirit tells him that it is better for "one man to perish than for an entire nation to dwindle and perish in unbelief." Nephi follows through with the command and then dresses himself in Laban's clothing and armor. He returns to Laban's house and orders Zoram, one of Laban's servants, to bring him the brass plates. When he leads Zoram back to his brothers, they think that Nephi is Laban and turn to flee; Nephi calls out to them. Realizing that Nephi is not Laban, Zoram turns to run, but Nephi stops him. He commands him to join them as an act of self-preservation, to which Zoram consents.

Sometime after they obtain the brass plates, the Lord tells Lehi to send his sons back to Jerusalem so they can convince Ishmael’s family to join them. This allows Lehi’s sons to marry, as Ishmael is father to five daughters. They succeed and return to the wilderness. During the journey, Laman and Lemuel as well as members of Ishmael’s family defy Nephi, three of Ishmael’s daughters, and Ishmael and his wife. They want to go back to Jerusalem. When Nephi warns them that they will be destroyed if they do so, they tie him up, planning to leave him behind on their journey. Nephi's bonds are loosed by the Lord when he prays for help. Laman and Lemuel want to tie him again, but eventually give in to the pleas of mercy from Ishmael's family.

Nephi and his family spend eight years in the wilderness, facing many hardships. At one point Nephi's bow breaks, making it difficult to obtain food. While the rest of the family complains, Nephi sets forth to make a new bow and prays to God for help.

=== Building the ship and voyage ===
Finally, in the land of Bountiful, God commands Nephi to build a ship and sail to the Promised Land. However, Laman and Lemuel do not think he should build it. They try to throw Nephi into the depths of the sea; however, Nephi commands them not to, warning them that they will be smitten by the power of God if they touch him. In response, Laman and Lemuel try worshipping Nephi, but he commands them to stop. Meanwhile, the Spirit protects Nephi.

Partway through the voyage over sea, Laman, Lemuel, and some of Ishmael's family participate in irreverent revelry. Nephi asks them to stop, but in their anger they tie him up. The Liahona stops working and they are significantly delayed in their journey until the brothers finally untie him. This done, Nephi prays to God and the storm calms down.

=== Life in the Promised Land ===
Not long after arriving in the Promised Land, Lehi dies, leaving the leadership of the colony in Nephi's hands. His brothers Laman and Lemuel rebel shortly thereafter, and the colony splits into two. Nephi's followers name themselves "Nephites" while the others are dubbed "Lamanites". The Nephites separate into the wilderness, where they begin building in the land of Nephi. Within twenty-one years of arriving in the Promised Land, Nephi's people construct a temple. Nephi teaches his people artisan skills, including but not limited to wood and metal work. Under Nephi's leadership, the Nephite civilization prospers despite occasional war with the Lamanites. According to the Book of Mormon, Nephi is revered by his people. Upon his death, Jacob is entrusted with keeping the records of the Book of Mormon.

== Nephi's vision ==
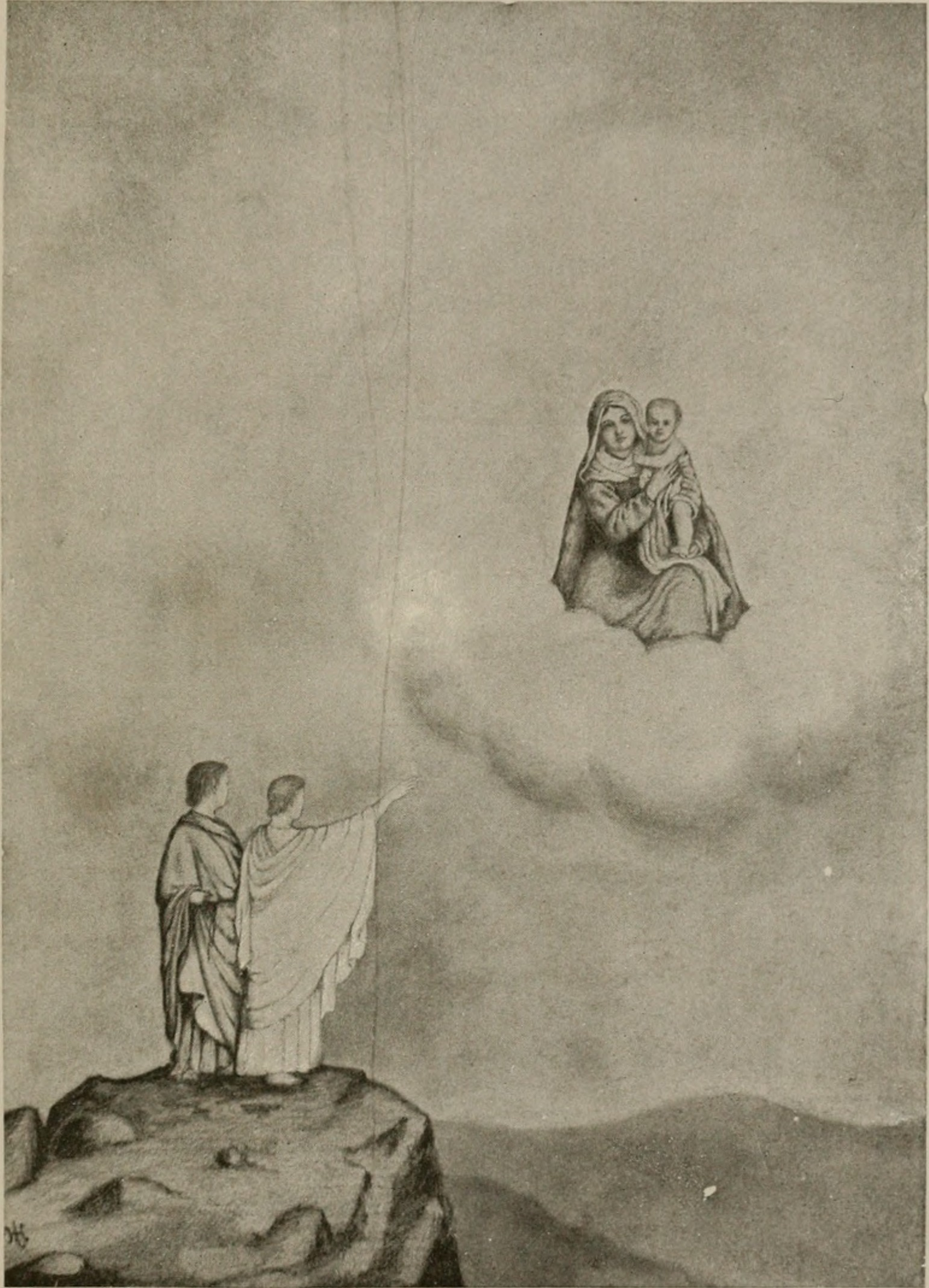
Nephi's vision of the young Jesus and Mary

After his father receives a Vision of the Tree of Life, Nephi receives a similar vision and records it in detail, including an interpretation of each element of the dream. Nephi also sees and records details of the birth, life, and crucifixion of Jesus Christ. An angel also shows him similar things to those found in the vision of John the Revelator.

== Latter-day Saint interpretation ==
=== Obtaining the brass plates ===
Anthropologist Steven L. Olsen points out that the journey to possess the brass plates is the first instance in which Nephi is portrayed as a leader of his brothers. Additionally, Olsen points out that deliverance and remembering are themes that show up in Nephi's account. In fact, the concept of deliverance is one factor in Nephi's contemplation of killing Laban. Writing about this contemplation, R. John Williams, who is an assistant professor of English at Yale, concludes that while Nephi's internal struggle is very personal, his rationalization of killing Laban appears to be more unemotional. According to Hardy, Nephi's difficult decision demonstrates the value of the brass plates to his family. Robert L. Millet explains that the brass plates serve as a link between the Nephites and their predecessors. The content of the plates gives the people a connection to their ancestors, culture, and religious beliefs.

Further, healthcare technologist Ben McGuire identifies what he calls "thematic parallels" between Nephi's slaying of Laban and David's killing of Goliath; among the parallels are confrontation with an intimidating foe, fear of the foe, and slaughter of the foe. Author Elizabeth Fenton, on the other hand, compares Nephi and Laban to David and Saul, pointing out that Nephi killed Laban but David did not kill Saul, while both were encouraged to kill said enemies.

=== The ship ===
The design for Nephi's ship is divine, which theme is common in various Biblical stories, says legal editor Alan Goff. He points out that Nephi wants to make it clear that he is following a divine pattern. On another note, Riess compares Nephi's calming of the water to Jesus' calming of the storm in the New Testament, pointing out that while Jesus used his own power, Nephi prayed.

=== Visions ===
Like others, during his visions Nephi is often taken by the Spirit into a mountain. Brent Farley, who is the former manager of Church Educational System College Curriculum within the LDS church, explains in a devotional-type article that this transportation by the Spirit to a mountain typically occurs in religious records when a temple is unavailable to worship in.

== Nephi as a narrator ==
Though Nephi begins his narrative with a basic genealogy, he eventually shifts from a familial to a national focus. Nevertheless, he is conscious of his posterity as he writes. Nephi desires that his record should be filled with religious things. Hardy proposes that Nephi portrays Laman and Lemuel in a negative light in order to solidify his purpose of showing the Lord’s deliverance. Nephi rarely talks about Laman and Lemuel individually, and hardly mentions Sam—possibly an attempt to greater emphasize Laman and Lemuel. Robert A. Rees agrees concerning Nephi's rhetorical purposes, stating that Nephi is deliberately shaping the reading experience. He argues that Nephi brings his first-person biases into the narrative, making it difficult for his readers to have an impartial perspective. In Claudia L. Bushman's view, Nephi emphasizes different aspects of the narrative more than others, which impacts the reader experience. According to Hardy, however, Nephi’s motives are not only religious but also political. Latter-day Saint lawyer Nathan B. Oman explains that legal issues are woven into Nephi's narrative, especially those that concern his brothers.

Fenton argues that Nephi did not write the Book of Mormon for the Nephites, as implied by his inclusion of his dream about their destruction. Nephi was well-versed in Jewish scripture and could read and write in Egyptian. His teaching style has been described as "frank, direct, and even blunt". At the same time, Rees suggests that Nephi may have drawn inspiration for his writing style from passages found in the brass plates. Allusions to the Exodus are deliberate throughout Nephi's record, Michael Austin explains. Hardy notes several parallels between Nephi and Joseph: both are younger, favored sons whose older brothers resent him and attempt to murder him. Both escape death and later save their families from starvation. Contrasting the stories, Hardy finds that Joseph's story has more emotional range, whereas Nephi's narrative is limited to his "one-sided narrative". Bushman also notices that Nephi relies very little on the experiences of the other members of his travel party.

Writing in Dialogue in 1969, Robert E. Nichols noticed similarities between Nephi and a writing style from the heroic age. As evidence, Nichols draws parallels between the narrative's emphasis on Nephi's strength and manly skills and Beowulf's great strength and skills in Beowulf. In this reading, Nephi's beot, or ritual boast, is found in the famous passage where he says he will "go and do the things which the Lord hath commanded", and his brothers become his band of warriors.

== Nephi's legacy ==
The first major figure in the Book of Mormon, Nephi is regarded by members of the Latter Day Saint Movement as a prophet, political leader, and record keeper. Bergin points out that Nephi shares some semblance to Moses, such as being a colonial leader. Riess also points out similarities between the two, such as their both receiving commandments from the Lord atop a mountain. A number of individuals throughout the Book of Mormon were named after Nephi, including all of the kings in the early Nephite civilization. Additionally, his people referred to themselves as "Nephites"—a name that followed them through the entire 1000-year history given in the Book of Mormon. Nephi is also the name of a city in Utah.

== Etymology of Nephi ==
The origin of the name Nephi is uncertain and disputed. Based on a non–Latter-day Saint or secular perspective, hypotheses for the name's origin include:

- Its appearance as a geographic name in 2 Maccabees of the Deuterocanon: "And Neemias called this thing Naphthar, which is as much as to say, a cleansing: but many men call it Nephi."
- A reference to the nephilim (נְפִילִים), who are the mythical half-immortal "giants" described in Genesis. The name means "fallen ones".
- Or the term Nephes, which is a Kabbalistic term for a ghost that wanders around sepulchers.

Latter-day Saint scholar John Gee theorizes that Nephi is a Hebrew form of the Egyptian name Nfr. In Phoenician and Aramaic inscriptions of Egyptian names containing nfr, the nfr element is rendered npy, and the closely related Hebrew language would presumably transcribe the name the same way.

== Nephi in Latter-day Saint literature ==
Orrin R. Wilcox writes about the journey of Nephi's family in verse form, telling it from Nephi's perspective. In two of the poems Wilcox shares the story of why Nephi's family left Jerusalem, then describes the family relationships. "I was built large in stature / And my brothers did defy", he explains. Wilcox continues to contrast Nephi with Laman and Lemuel, specifically discussing their attitudes about leaving Jerusalem. Later, he writes about obtaining the brass plates and visiting Ishmael's family. When he writes about the brass plates, Wilcox explores the feelings and actions of Nephi as he kills Laban and brings Zoram with him.

In her collection Book of Mormon and Other Poems, Latter-day Saint poet Mildred Hunt includes a poem that tells of the retrieval of Ishmael's daughters in an allegory of gardeners coming to select beautiful willow and cypress trees for their homes, where the trees represent Ishmael's daughters and the gardeners represent the sons of Lehi. She spends most of the poem describing the grace and beauty of the trees; in the last stanza, however, she tells how their father let the four gardeners select their trees of choice. In her poetry she also explores how Nephi may have felt at various points in his life, including an inference of what successes he may have experienced: "How thankful and how pleased, Nephi, were you / When that first harvest gilt the wilderness."

An emeritus English professor at Pepperdine University and Latter-day Saint, Michael R. Collings wrote a book entitled The Nephiad. This epic-style work retells parts of the life of Nephi, from Lehi's revelation to leave Jerusalem to Nephi's vision of Jesus Christ, with some creative imagination. Collings describes Nephi's vision of the Americas at the time of Jesus' death as follows: "This Nephi saw, and fain would turn away / Tormented eyes from scenes calamitous / ...Tempests, floods, and quakings o'er the Land / With fracturing force disrupted Spring-smooth soils."

== See also ==
- First Book of Nephi
- Second Book of Nephi
- Plates of Nephi
- Reformed Egyptian
- Tree of life vision
- Nephites
- Nephi, Utah, named after him.

== Works cited ==
- Auffarth, Christoph; Stuckenbruck, Loren T., eds. (22 February 2004). The Fall of the Angels. Brill. p. 34. ISBN 978-90-04-12668-8.
- Austin, Michael (2024). The Testimony of Two Nations: How the Book of Mormon Reads, and Rereads, the Bible. University of Illinois Press. pp. 80–84. ISBN 978-0-252-08747-9. Wikidata Q123671090.
- Bergin, Allen E. (1983). "Nephi, a Universal Man". The Book of Mormon: It Begins with a Family. Salt Lake City, Utah, USA: Deseret Book. pp. 32–33.
- Bingman, Margaret (1978). Encyclopedia of the Book of Mormon. Herald House. pp. 253–257. ISBN 0-8309-0199-X. Wikidata Q123363520.
- Bushman, Claudia L. (2015). "I, Nephi". In Faulconer, James E.; Spencer, Joseph M. (eds.). Perspectives on Mormon Theology: Scriptural Theology. Salt Lake City, Utah, USA: Greg Kofford Books. pp. 81–96. ISBN 978-1-58958-713-7.
- Collings, Michael R. (2010). The Nephiad: An Epic Poem in XII Books (2nd ed.). The Borgo Press, part of Wildside Press LLC. p. 188. ISBN 978-1-4344-5756-1.
- Fenton, Elizabeth (1 January 2016). "Understanding the Book of Mormon". Journal of Book of Mormon Studies. 25 (1): 43–45. JSTOR 10.18809/jbms.2016.0105.
- Gardner, Brant (2007). Second Witness. Volume 1 First Nephi. Vol. 1. Greg Kofford Books. pp. 190–191. ISBN 978-1-58958-041-1. Wikidata Q123118187.
- Givens, Terryl L. (2009). The Book of Mormon: A Very Short Introduction. Oxford University Press. pp. 17–18, 33, 37–38, 43, 86. doi:10.1093/actrade/9780195369311.001.0001. ISBN 978-0-19-936567-8. Wikidata Q114004901.
- Goff, Alan (1992). "Boats, Beginnings, and Repetitions". Journal of Book of Mormon Studies. 1 (1): 72–75. JSTOR 44758622 – via ScholarsArchive BYU.
- Hardy, Grant (2010). Understanding the Book of Mormon: A Reader's Guide. Oxford University Press. pp. 32–34, 46, 48–49, 55–57. ISBN 978-0-19-973170-1. OL 24418834M. Wikidata Q123382112.
- Hardy, Grant, ed. (2023). The Annotated Book of Mormon. Oxford University Press. pp. 21–22. ISBN 978-0-19-008220-8. OL 46783409M. Wikidata Q122259222.
- Heiser, Michael S. "The Meaning of the Word Nephilim: Fact vs. Fantasy" (PDF). Archived from the original (PDF) on 27 September 2011.
- Hilton, Lynn M.; Hilton, Hope A. (1996). Discovering Lehi : New evidence of Lehi and Nephi in Arabia. Springville, UT: Cedar Fort, Inc. ISBN 1555172768.
- Largey, Dennis L.; Arnold, Marilyn; Ball, Terry; Dahl, Larry E.; Parry, Donald; Seely, David R.; Williams, Clyde J., eds. (2003). Book of Mormon Reference Companion. Deseret Book Company. pp. 583–586. ISBN 1-57345-231-9. Wikidata Q123364479.
- Marks, Herbert (1995). "Biblical Naming and Poetic Etymology". Journal of Biblical Literature. 114 (1): 21–42. doi:10.2307/3266588. JSTOR 3266588.
- McGuire, Ben (31 January 2009). "Nephi and Goliath: A Case Study of Literary Allusion in the Book of Mormon". Journal of Book of Mormon Studies. 18 (1): 20–23 – via BYU ScholarsArchive.
- Millet, Robert L. (1989). Nyman, Monte S. (ed.). "The Influence of the Brass Plates on the Teachings of Nephi | Religious Studies Center". rsc.byu.edu.
- Moore, Heather B. (2010). Women of the Book of Mormon: Insights and Inspirations. American Fork, Utah, USA: Covenant Communications. pp. 13–14. ISBN 978-1-68047-658-3.
- Olsen, Steven L. (2009). "The Death of Laban: A Literary Interpretation". Mormon Studies Review. 21 (1). University of Illinois Press: 184–192 – via Scholarly Publishing Collective.
- Oman, Nathan B. (2022). "Nomos, Narrative, and Nephi: Legal Interpretation in the Book of Mormon". British Journal of American Legal Studies. 11 (2). Sciendo: 314–318. doi:10.2478/bjals-2022-0004.
- Quinn, D. Michael (1987). Early Mormonism and the Magic World View. Signature Books. pp. 156–57.
- Quinn, D. Michael (1998). Early Mormonism and the magic world view ([Rev. and enlarged ed.] ed.). Salt Lake City: Signature Books. ISBN 1-56085-089-2.
- Rees, Robert A. (2020). A New Witness to the World. Salt Lake City, Utah, USA: BCC Press. pp. 22–24. ISBN 978-1-948218-35-1.
- Reynolds, Noel B. (6 August 2021). "The Brass Plates in Context: A Book of Mormon Backstory" (PDF). Faculty Publications (5378): 9–13 – via BYU ScholarsArchive.
- Riess, Jana (2005). The Book of Mormon: Selections Annotated and Explained. USA: SkyLight Illuminations. pp. 36, 38, 40, 46. ISBN 1-59473-076-8.
- Roncace, Mark (2005). Jeremiah, Zedekiah, and the Fall of Jerusalem. USA: T & T Clark. pp. 146–159. ISBN 0-567-02671-X.
- Salleh, Fatimah; Hemming, Margaret (2020). The Book of Mormon for the Least of These Vol. 1. Vol. 1. By Common Consent Press. ISBN 978-1-948218-23-8. Wikidata Q123378840.
- Sayre, Jillian (2019). "Books Buried in the Earth". In Fenton, Elizabeth; Hickman, Jared Winston (eds.). Americanist Approaches to the Book of Mormon. Oxford University Press. pp. 32–39. ISBN 978-0-19-022192-8. Wikidata Q123497267.
- Sorensen, Peter J. (2003). "Mormoniad: The Book of Mormon as Proto-epic". Annual of the Association for Mormon Letters. pp. 21–34.
- Spencer, Joseph (2018). "Teaching the Book of Mormon at the University of Vermont: An Interview with Elizabeth Fenton". Journal of Book of Mormon Studies. 27 (1): 133. JSTOR 10.5406/jbookmormstud2.27.2018.0128.
- Thomas, John Christopher (2016). A Pentecostal Reads the Book of Mormon: A Literary and Theological Introduction. CPT Press. ISBN 978-1-935931-55-3. Wikidata Q123196681.
- Williams, R. John (2019). "The Ghost and the Machine". In Fenton, Elizabeth; Hickman, Jared Winston (eds.). Americanist Approaches to the Book of Mormon. Oxford University Press. pp. 56–58. ISBN 978-0-19-022192-8. Wikidata Q123497267.

First	Nephite record keeper of the small plates 600 BC – 544 BC	Succeeded by Jacob
