= Lehi (prophet) =

Father of Nephi in the Book of Mormon

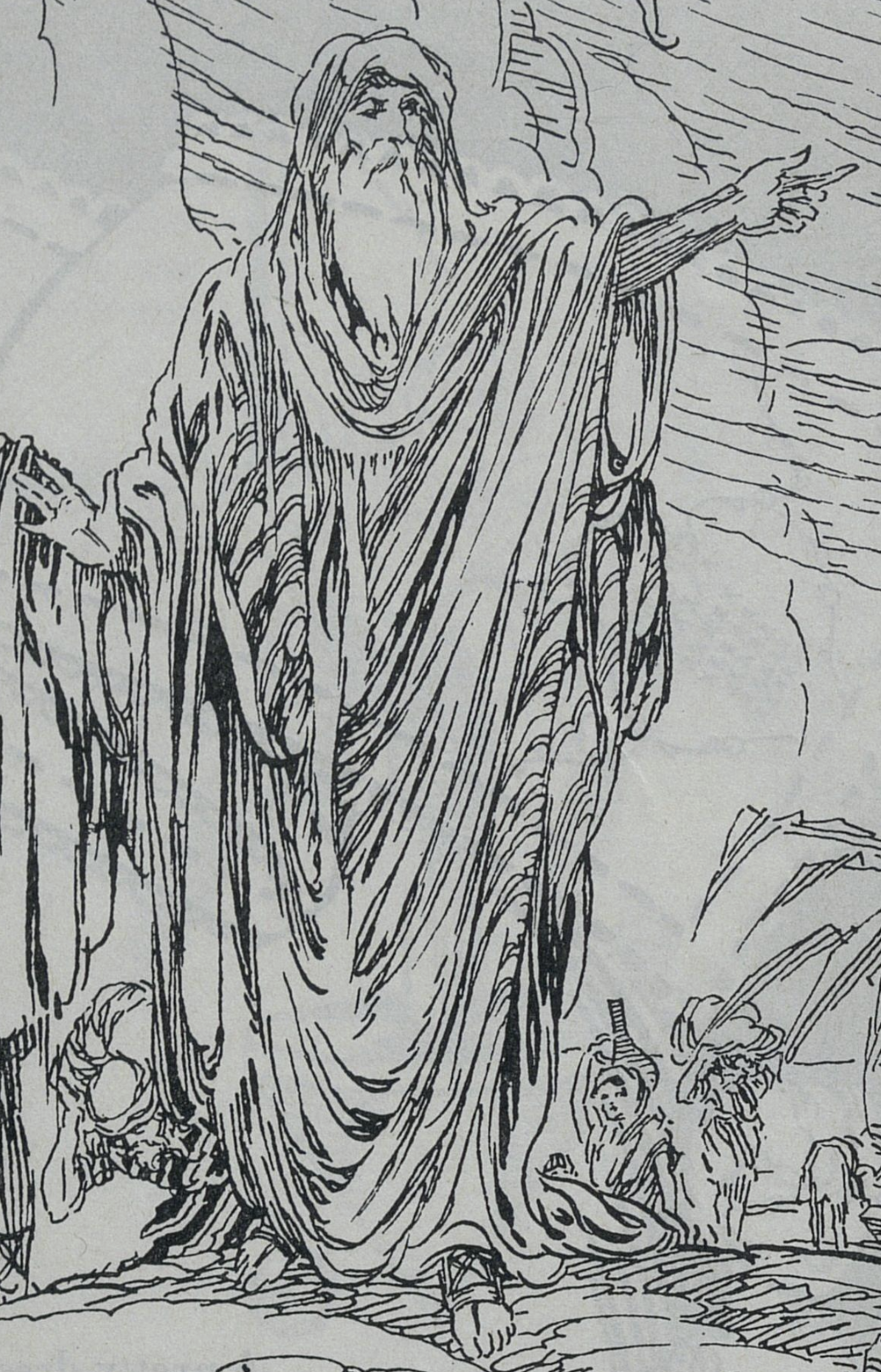
- Lehi in The Promised Land (September 1925)

Personal life
- Spouse: Sariah
- Children: Laman and Lemuel; Sam; Nephi; Jacob; Joseph
- Known for: Tree of life vision

According to the Book of Mormon, Lehi (/ˈliːhaɪ/ LEE-hy) was a prophet who lived in Jerusalem during the reign of King Zedekiah (approximately 600 BC). In First Nephi, Lehi is rejected for preaching repentance and he leads his family, including Sariah, Laman, Lemuel, Sam, and Nephi, into the wilderness. He sends his sons back to recover the plates of brass and once more for the family of Ishmael. As they travel, Lehi has a vision of the tree of life in which most of his family, except Laman and Lemuel, accepts God. He also prophesies Christ's coming 600 years in the future.

Lehi has two sons in the wilderness before they arrive at the ocean, where Nephi is directed to build a boat. They cross the sea, and Lehi and Sariah become sick because of Laman and Lemuel's rebellion. Before he dies, Lehi blesses his sons and their families.

Lehi likely had daughters in addition to his named sons and has been compared to Moses both in his calling as a prophet and leadership of an exodus. He may have made two different kinds of sacrifices, namely peace offerings and burnt offerings, based on the Book of Mormon text and Old Testament descriptions. It is noted that Lehi claimed the land his family landed on despite others already living there. Some religious scholars speculate, based on travel time, that Lehi and his family received assistance from nearby tribes as they travelled, possibly in return for work or even servitude. Others compare the pointed mentioning of Lehi's tent to scriptural connections between tents and temples. Lehi's record is claimed to have been contained in the lost 116 pages of the Book of Mormon translation. One phrase of his has been compared to a quote from William Shakespeare's Hamlet, with some suggesting Joseph Smith took it from the play and others suggesting a precedent of similar phrasing around Lehi's time.

He is the namesake of the modern-day city of Lehi, Utah, and has been depicted in many fiction and non-fiction books, movies, and works of art.

== Narration ==
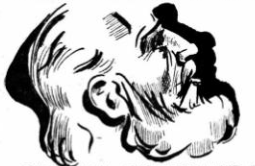
John Philip Dalby's depiction of Lehi

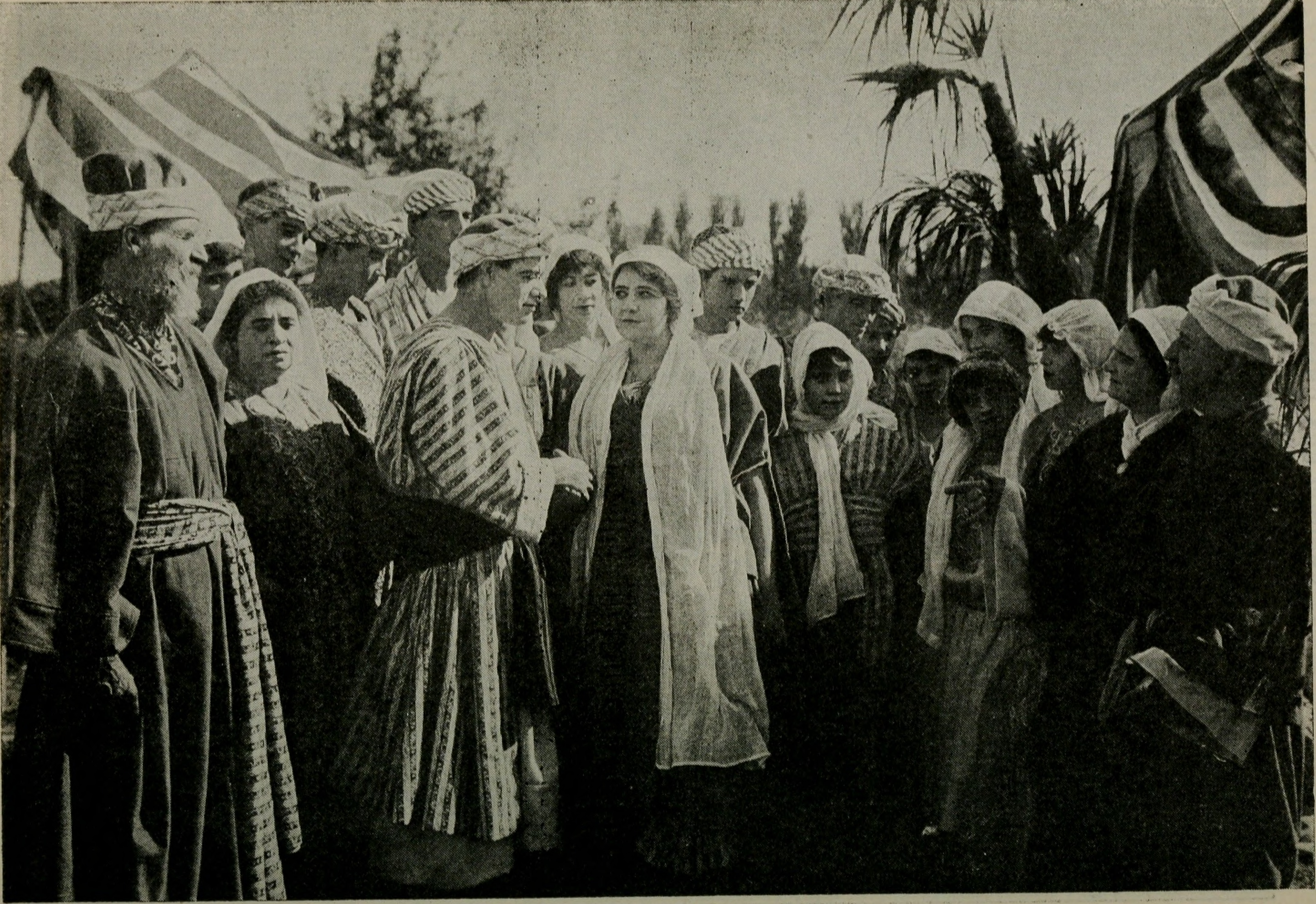
Still of Lehi's family from the lost film, Life of Nephi (1915)

In the Book of Mormon, Lehi is a descendant of Joseph of Egypt, husband of Sariah, and father of Laman, Lemuel, Sam, Nephi, Jacob, Joseph, and two or more daughters. He lives in Jerusalem around 600 years before the coming of Jesus Christ in a time when many prophets are preaching the city would be destroyed. After hearing this, he prays on behalf of the people and has a vision from God of the destruction of Jerusalem. Following this vision, he begins to preach to the people that they need to repent, but they try to kill him. The Lord commands Lehi to take his family and any supplies they need and leave everything else behind. He then builds an altar and offers burnt sacrifices in thanks to the Lord for saving his family. His sons Laman and Lemuel complain about leaving everything behind.

The Lord asks Lehi to send his sons back to Jerusalem for the plates of brass, which contain family records and other teachings, from Laban. His wife Sariah complains against him for sending them into danger, thinking they might be dead. When they return safely, Lehi reads through the plates, discovers he is descended from Joseph of Egypt, and teaches his sons more of what he learns from the records.

Lehi sends his sons back to Jerusalem again to gather the family of Ishmael to travel with them. Sometime after their return, he has a dream with a vision of a tree of life in which Sariah, Sam, and Nephi eat of the fruit representing God's love and Laman and Lemuel choose not to. Upon waking, he shares the dream with his family and, worrying about Laman and Lemuel, he teaches them they need to be more faithful. In another vision, he predicts the Messiah will come within 600 years.

One morning, he finds a compass outside of his tent which guides his family in their travels. They continue traveling and come to a land they name Bountiful. While camping in Bountiful, Nephi's bow breaks and they suffer from food shortage. Lehi begins to complain alongside Laman, Lemuel, and the sons of Ishmael, but Nephi speaks to them and the Lord "chastens" Lehi. After he repents, Lehi asks the Lord where to find food and is able to direct Nephi on where to go with his new bow. As the group continues and arrives at the ocean, it is revealed that Lehi has had two more sons in the wilderness, Jacob and Joseph. The family is guided across the ocean, but Laman and Lemuel's rebellious actions along the way cause Lehi and Sariah so much grief that they become sick and close to death.

Lehi has another vision after arriving in the Promised Land that Jerusalem has been destroyed. He shares that the land they have been guided to is promised to his descendants as an inheritance as long as they follow God's commandments. Before his death, he blesses his sons and their families. He also quotes from a prophecy in the brass plates, saying that there will be a seer in the future who was a descendant of Joseph of Egypt and Lehi's son Joseph, and whose father would be named Joseph. After blessing his family, Lehi grows old and dies.

Lehi's prophesies include the destruction of Jerusalem, Babylonian captivity, the Jews returning to Jerusalem, the teachings of John the Baptist, the coming of Christ, Christ's resurrection, and the gathering of Israel.

== Family relationships ==
Lehi's known immediate family according to the Book of Mormon is as shown in the diagram below.

Lehi	Sariah
Laman	Lemuel	Sam	Nephi	Jacob	Joseph

=== Daughters ===
Lehi's son, Nephi, mentions having sisters in his writings, although their names and birth order are unknown. The Encyclopedia of the Book of Mormon suggests Lehi had these daughters after leaving Jerusalem. Latter-day Saint Book of Mormon scholars and apologists Hugh Nibley and Sidney B. Sperry propose that the wives of the two married sons of Ishmael may have been Lehi's daughters as it was customary at the time for daughters to marry their father's brother's sons.

=== Laman and Lemuel ===
Laman and Lemuel are often spoken of in negative terms such as when Lehi urges them to improve and be firm and continuously righteous as the river and the valley in which they are camping. In The Book of Mormon For the Least of These, a Book of Mormon commentary, Fatimah Salleh and Margaret Hemming suggest that rather than a scolding, this encouragement should be viewed as Lehi having sustained love and hope for his children. Writing in 1969 for Dialogue, Robert E. Nichols attributes Laman and Lemuel's confession that they cannot understand Lehi's words to Lehi's metaphorical language.

== Interpretation ==
=== Lehi's exodus ===
Nephi has been brought up as a Moses figure in the past, says BYU professor and past director of FARMS Noel B. Reynolds, but Lehi may have set that example as well. In an analysis of Lehi's final words to his family, Reynolds suggests fourteen different connections to Moses. There were often issues with people in Lehi's group failing to acknowledge him as a prophet. As his children knew and understood Moses as a prophet and leader of the exodus from Egypt, Lehi may have used comparisons to Moses to help them understand the significance of the Lord's guidance of their family and the commandments he asked them to follow. Lehi's exodus from Jerusalem has been compared to that of Moses, and additionally sets a precedent for the exodus of later groups in the Book of Mormon. Lehi was called just as Moses was when he prayed to the Lord for his people. Both Lehi and Moses left with their people and led them into the desert through times of difficulty and rebellion. In different occasions, both groups tried to kill their leader. They received commandments, were directed by God, and were led to a promised land.

Scholars S. Kent Brown, Terrence l. Szink, and Bruce J. Boehm add that as 1 Nephi was written a number of years after it happened, Nephi may have noticed similarities between the Israelite exodus and Lehi's leadership of their own journey and reflected that realization as he wrote his history.

=== Religious sacrifices ===
Multiple offerings are mentioned in Lehi's appearance in the Book of Mormon and S. Kent Brown suggests these were sacrifices of thanksgiving as well as burnt offerings for sin. Both times Lehi's sons returned from Jerusalem, joy and thanks are described, which lines up with descriptions the sacrifices of thanksgiving described in Psalm 107, says Brown. Sacrifices of thanksgiving are alternately translated as peace offerings, which were connected with the idea of well-being and therefore with safe travels. Such offerings were common and often involved a meal, the sacrifice itself being an animal and unleavened bread. Brown suggests Lehi and his family may have traded with local tribes for animals to sacrifice. Additionally, just as priests in Jerusalem offered daily burnt sacrifices in the likelihood that someone somewhere had sinned that day, Lehi's burnt sacrifices would have been to cover the sins of his family.

=== Land inheritance ===
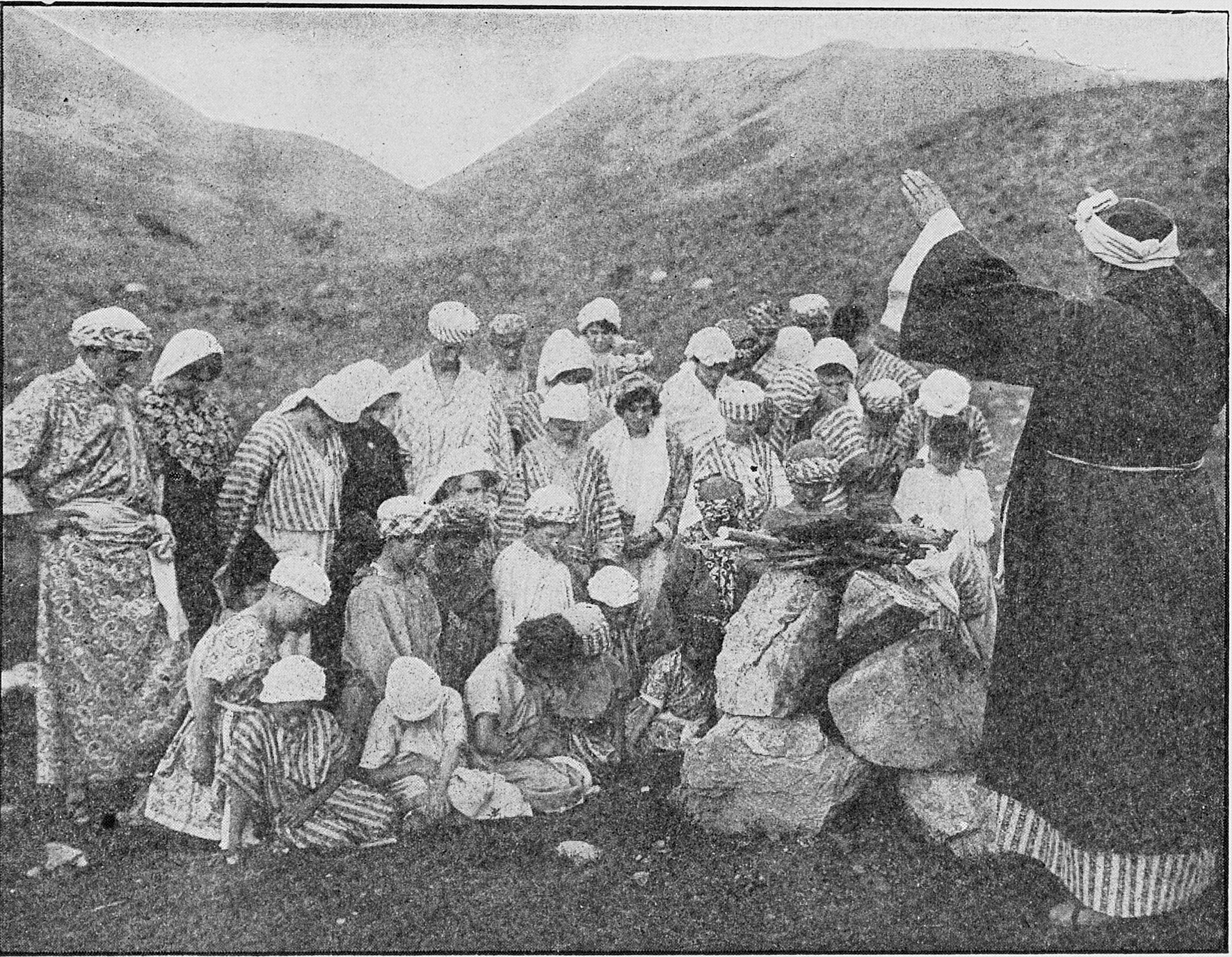
"Arrival in the promised land" still from Life of Nephi (Lehi at right)

Salleh and Hemming also touch on Lehi's mindset of inheriting the Americas as the Promised Land. They point out that there are already people living on the continent when Lehi and his family arrive, and how Lehi talks about having possession of the land as a right. This may be notable in the context that Lehi has been traveling for years without land of his own.

=== Bondage in the wilderness ===
BYU professor of ancient scripture S. Kent Brown explains that in Lehi's time, a large caravan could travel from the Indian Ocean to the Mediterranean in a span of weeks rather than years. The full journey is said to have taken about eight years, and Brown suggests the activities and traveling from Jerusalem to the first camp and on to Nahom lasted less than a year. This time gap presents, according to Brown, a missing part of the narration. Based on the resources they brought with them and the fact that they ran out of food multiple times on the way, Lehi and his family may have turned to a tribe in the area for help in exchange for work. It is noted that in the Bible, "to sojourn" is linked to servitude or living under the protection of another.

=== Lehi's record and the 116 pages ===
Nephi begins his record claiming he's making an abridgement of his father's writings. Latter-day Saint founder and prophet Joseph Smith claimed that the first 116 translated pages of the Book of Mormon which were lost included the Book of Lehi.

=== "The cold and silent grave" ===
Latter-day Saint apologist Hugh Nibley writes of the oft-compared phrasing from 2 Nephi 1:14 with a quote from Hamlet.

Phrase comparison
2 Nephi 1:14	"the cold and silent grave, from whence no traveler can return"
Hamlet	"that undiscovered country, from whose bourne no traveler returns"

Alexander Campbell of the Millennial Harbinger proposes that the words were copied from Shakespeare. Nibley alternatively suggests that although the wording is similar, there are other examples of similar usage around Lehi's time period. Independent scholar Robert F. Smith, who studies Near Eastern languages, cites specific linguistic connections to the verse from outside sources of ancient times and other similarities specifically within the Bible.

== Modern commemorations ==
Lehi, Arizona, and Lehi, Utah, were named after him by Latter-day Saint settlers.

== In art ==
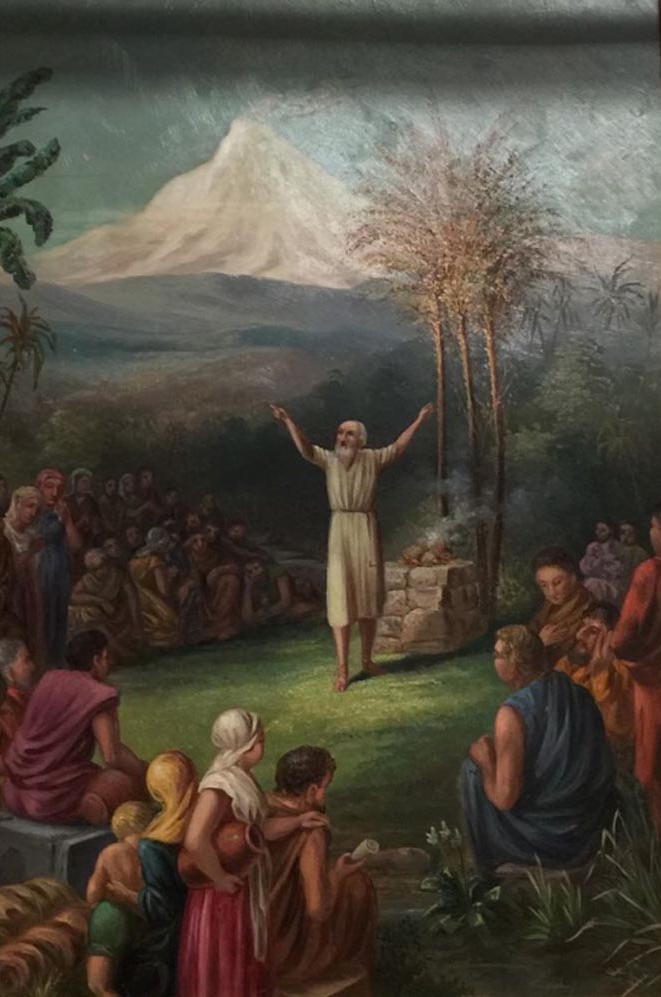
Arrival in the New World (c. 1890) by George M. Ottinger (Lehi shown standing at center)

The Book of Mormon Art Catalog records multiple depictions of Lehi in visual art. Lehi's tree of life vision was among the first subjects of artwork of Book of Mormon content, and around 1874 David Hyrum Smith, a son of Joseph Smith and a leader in the Reorganized Church of Jesus Christ of Latter Day Saints (later renamed to Community of Christ), produced Lehi's Dream, portraying Lehi being led to the tree of life by an angel. The Church of Jesus Christ of Latter-day Saints' first visual artwork of Lehi's dream was produced in about 1949–1951 by American painter Minerva Teichert; her The House of the World depicts Lehi beckoning his family, who clasp the iron rod, with Sariah in focus in the image's center. After receiving a copy of the Book of Mormon and reading its stories, Polish Catholic artist Roman Śledź created several woodcarvings of Book of Mormon scenes, including Wizja Lehiego—Drzewo Życia depicting Lehi’s dream of the tree of life. From January to May 2024, the Harold B. Lee Library's Reynolds Auditorium Gallery hosted an exhibition of artwork of Lehi's vision of the tree of life. Depictions of Lehi's tree of life vision account for 7% of all visual art of Book of Mormon content.

Danish-American painter C. C. A. Christensen's 1890 Lehi Blessing His Posterity portrays Lehi with his family. American artist George M. Ottinger's Arrival in the New World, also produced around 1890, is a scene of Lehi with Ishmael, Nephi, and family. Teichert's Loading the Ship, created 1949–1951, shows a scene of Lehi's family. In the twentieth century, American illustrator Arnold Friberg produced a series of 12 paintings depicting scenes from the Book of Mormon, including portrayals of Lehi such as in Lehi in the Wilderness Discovers the Liahona and Lehi and His People Arrive in the Promised Land. In an interview, Friberg said of his Lehi in the Wilderness that he envisioned Lehi as a "wealthy man" and intentionally portrayed him with "rich clothing". In the same interview, Friberg pointed out that in his Lehi and His People Arrive, while most of the figures express excitement about arriving, Lehi visibly "is looking heavenward in thanks".

== Sources Cited ==
- Bingman, Margaret (1978). Encyclopedia of the Book of Mormon. Herald House. ISBN 0-8309-0199-X. Wikidata Q123363520.
- Champoux, Jennifer (2023). "The Thing Which I Have Seen: A History of Lehi's Dream in Visual Art". In Keogh, Benjamin; Spencer, Joseph M.; Champoux, Jennifer (eds.). Approaching the Tree: Interpreting 1 Nephi 8. Maxwell Institute for Religious Scholarship. ISBN 978-0-8425-0059-3.
- Largey, Dennis L.; Arnold, Marilyn; Ball, Terry; Dahl, Larry E.; Parry, Donald; Seely, David R.; Williams, Clyde J., eds. (2003). Book of Mormon Reference Companion. Deseret Book Company. ISBN 1-57345-231-9. Wikidata Q123364479.
- Nibley, Hugh Winder (1952). Lehi in the Desert and The World of the Jaredites. Salt Lake City, Utah: Bookcraft Publishing Company. p. 36..
- Nibley, Preston (1853). The History of Joseph Smith by His Mother. Salt Lake City, Utah: Bookcraft Publishing Company..
- Salleh, Fatimah; Hemming, Margaret (2020). The Book of Mormon for the Least of These Vol. 1. Vol. 1. By Common Consent Press. ISBN 978-1-948218-23-8. Wikidata Q123378840.
- Swanson, Vern (April 2001). "The Book of Mormon Art of Arnold Friberg: Painter of Scripture". Journal of Book of Mormon Studies. 10 (1): 26–35. doi:10.5406/jbookmormstud.10.1.0026. S2CID 193780597.
- Thomas, John Christopher (2016). A Pentecostal Reads the Book of Mormon: A Literary and Theological Introduction. CPT Press. ISBN 978-1-935931-55-3. Wikidata Q123196681.
- Westrup, Rebekah (2020). "Imaginings of the Book of Mormon: A Comparison of Arnold Friberg's and Minerva Teichert's Book of Mormon Paintings". Journal of Book of Mormon Studies. 29: 85–119. doi:10.5406/jbookmormstud2.29.2020.0085. S2CID 254324664.
