= Latter Day Saint movement and engraved metal plates =

Engraved metal plates are significant in the Latter Day Saint movement because in 1827, the founder, Joseph Smith, claimed to have obtained a set of engraved golden plates he had found four years earlier after being directed there by an angel. He claimed to have translated the engravings on the plates by divine power into English as the Book of Mormon, a religious text of that religious tradition.

Latter Day Saints believe that other engraved metal plates exist, many of which are mentioned in the Book of Mormon. In addition, Mormon apologists argue that the golden plates are part of a long tradition of writing on engraved metal plates in the Middle East.

== The golden plates ==
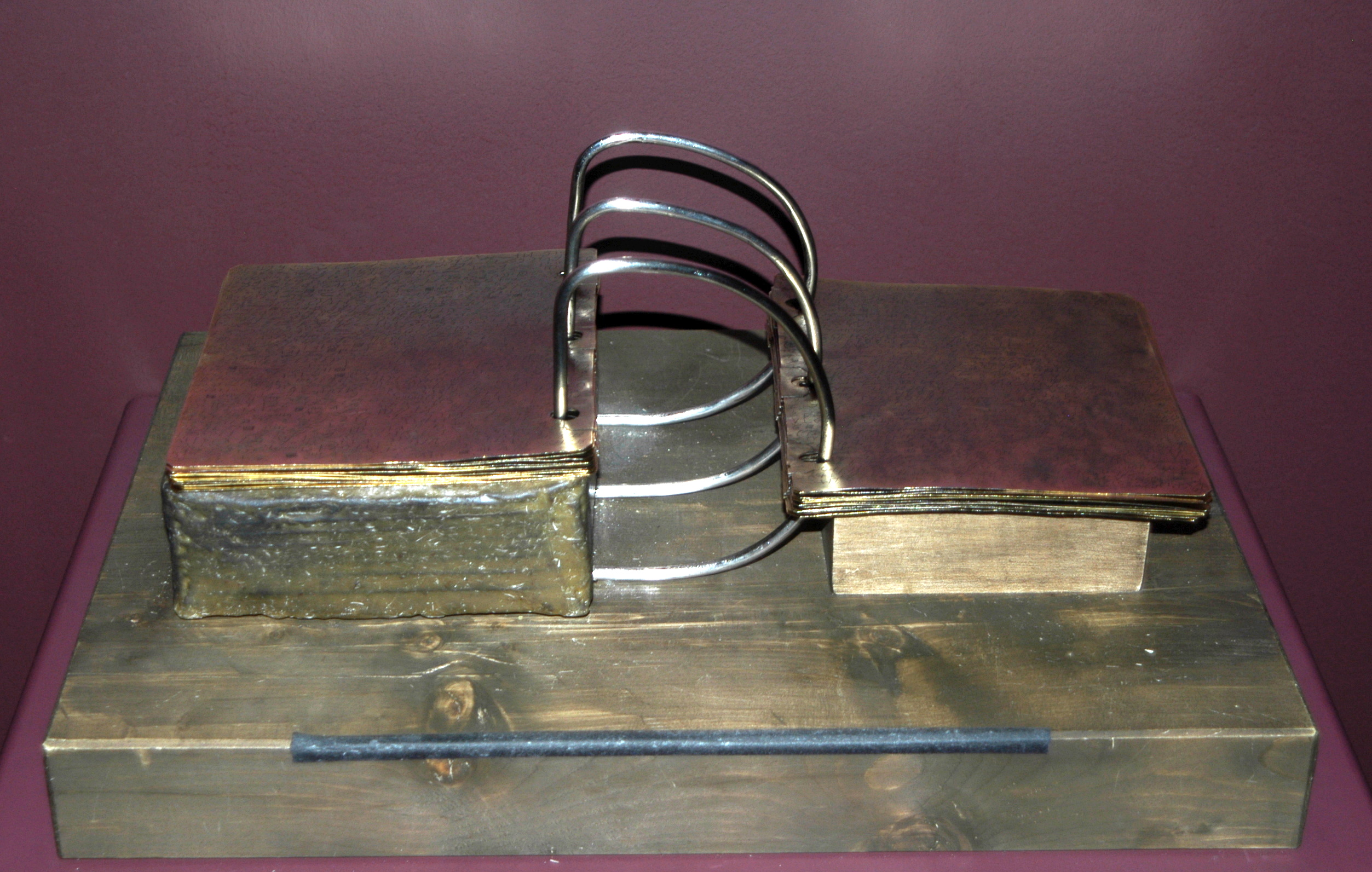
Full-scale model of the golden plates based on Joseph Smith's description

The golden plates are a set of bound and engraved metal plates that Latter Day Saint denominations believe are the source of Joseph Smith's English translation of the Book of Mormon. Although several witnesses said they saw the plates, Smith said that he returned them to an angel after the translation was completed. Most Latter Day Saints assume their authenticity as a matter of faith.

Smith said he discovered the plates on September 22, 1823, on Cumorah hill, Manchester, New York, where he said they had been hidden in a buried box and protected for centuries by the angel Moroni, a resurrected ancient American prophet-historian, who had been last to write on them. Smith claimed that the angel required him to obey certain commandments prior to receiving them and that his inability to obey prevented him from obtaining the plates until four years later, on September 22, 1827.

During this period, Smith also began dictating written commandments in the voice of God, including a commandment to form a new church and to choose eleven men who would join Smith as witnesses of the plates. These witnesses later declared, in two separate written statements attached to the 1830 published Book of Mormon, that they had seen the plates.

The Book of Mormon is accepted by adherents of the Latter Day Saint movement as a sacred text.

=== Proposed secular origins ===
There have been a variety of secular theories proposed for the origins of the Book of Mormon's plates. These range from theories based on environmental influences to psychological theories to pranking that grew into the Mormon faith.

The most recent scholarship, by Sonia Hazard, argues that the plates were inspired by printing plates or something similar. Joseph Smith, in this theory, would have either encountered "plates" or similar objects, possibly even on the Hill Cumorah, and believed them to be ancient artifacts. Given the presence of witnesses who attested to physical encounters with the plates, Hazard argues that physical objects seem most likely to be the stimulus of the Book of Mormon and therefore the brass plates' narrative role.

In a similar vein, Ann Taves argues that the belief of Joseph Smith and others in the plates contributed to them perceiving a physical object. While, in Taves's view, the plates were not a material reality, they seemed to be so for the faith's eyewitnesses.

Peter Ingersoll, a contemporary of Smith, was quoted by Eber D. Howe as saying that the brass plates were in fact a bag of sand. Ingersoll then relates the story of Smith deceiving his family, the Three Witnesses, and the Eight Witnesses with said bag of sand. Ingersoll indicates that this was a joke that spiraled into the Mormon movement.

== Book of Mormon ==
In addition to the golden plates, the Book of Mormon refers to several other sets of books written on metal plates:

- The brass plates, originally in the custody of Laban, containing the writings of Old Testament prophets before the Babylonian exile, as well as the otherwise unknown prophets Zenos, Zenoch, Neum, and possibly others.
- The large plates of Nephi, the source of the text abridged by Mormon and engraved on the golden plates.
- The small plates of Nephi, the source of the first and second books of Nephi, and the books of Jacob, Enos, Jarom and Omni, which replaced the lost 116 pages.
- The plates of Limhi
- A set of twenty-four plates found by the people of Limhi containing the record of the Jaredites, translated by King Mosiah, and abridged by Moroni as the Book of Ether.

== Kinderhook plates ==
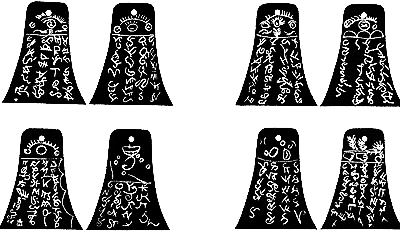
Obverse and reverse of four of the six Kinderhook plates, shown as facsimiles in a 1909 edition of the History of the Church, 5: 374–75.

In 1843, Smith acquired a set of six small bell-shaped plates, known as the Kinderhook plates, found in Kinderhook, Pike County, Illinois. The plates were manufactured and buried by three men who lived in Kinderhook, and who had intended the plates as a prank against the LDS community. Although Smith did not translate the plates, William Clayton, his secretary, wrote that Smith said they contained "the history of the person with whom they were found and he was a descendant of Ham through the loins of Pharaoh king of Egypt." As Richard Bushman has written:

"Joseph may not have detected the fraud, but he did not swing into a full-fledged translation as he had with the Egyptian scrolls. The trap did not quite spring shut, which foiled the conspirators original plan."

After Smith's death, the Kinderhook plates were presumed lost, and for decades the Church of Jesus Christ of Latter-day Saints (LDS Church) published facsimiles of them in its official History of the Church. In 1980, the Kinderhook Plates were tested at Brigham Young University and determined to have been manufactured during the nineteenth century. Today, the LDS Church acknowledges that the Kinderhook plates were a hoax.

== Voree plates ==
James Strang, one of many rival claimants to succeed Smith in the 1844 succession crisis, said that he had discovered and translated a set of plates known as the Voree plates or the "Voree Record." Like Smith, Strang produced witnesses to testify to his plates' authenticity. Although Strang's attempt to supplant Brigham Young as Smith's successor proved abortive, Smith's mother, Lucy Mack Smith, and for a time all living witnesses to the Book of Mormon, including the three Whitmers and Martin Harris (although perhaps excluding Oliver Cowdery), accepted "Strang's leadership, angelic call, metal plates, and his translation of these plates as authentic." Strang equally claimed to have discovered and translated the Plates of Laban spoken of in the Book of Mormon. As with the Voree Plates, Strang produced witnesses who authenticated them. Strang's purported translation of these plates was published in 1850 as the Book of the Law of the Lord, which together with the Voree Record, is accepted as Scripture by members of Strang's diminutive church, the Church of Jesus Christ of Latter Day Saints (Strangite).

== Other plates ==
Mormon apologist William J. Hamblin argues that the "Hebrews had a long-standing tradition dating at least to the First Temple period (i.e., well before 587 bc) of writing sacred texts on metal plates for amulets, inscriptions, and literary documents" and "the Greeks adopted the technology and practice of engraving sacred writings on metal plates from the Phoenicians at precisely the same time the Book of Mormon" in response to what he describes as critic claims of the "absurdity of the Book of Mormon having been written on golden plates", though he provides no quotes to validate any critic ever claimed this (link). Nonetheless, Hamblin admits, "specific Hebrew examples of writing on metal plates are relatively limited in number". There is no known extant example of writing on metal plates from the ancient Mediterranean longer than the eight-page Persian codex, and none from any ancient civilization in the Western Hemisphere.

== See also ==
- Reformed Egyptian
- Jordan Lead Codices
- List of plates in Mormonism
- Mandaic lead rolls
