= List of plates in Mormonism =

This article identifies the various inscribed plates (artifacts) relevant to the Latter Day Saint movement.

- The Golden plates were a set of plates that Joseph Smith had discovered in 1823 which were later translated and published as the Book of Mormon in 1830. The following other plates are described in the Book of Mormon.
  - The Brass Plates were a set of plates retrieved by Nephi at the direction of his father, Lehi. They contained Jewish records similar to the Old Testament, up to the time of Jeremiah.
  - The plates of Nephi
    - The large plates, the source of the text abridged by Mormon and engraved on the Golden plates.
    - The small plates, the source of the first and second books of Nephi, and the books of Jacob, Enos, Jarom, and Omni of the Book of Mormon, which were engraved upon the Golden plates.
  - The plates of Limhi
  - The Jaredite plates were a set of plates found by the people of Limhi containing the record of the Jaredites, translated by King Mosiah I, and abridged by Moroni as the Book of Ether which was engraved upon the Golden Plates.
- The Kinderhook plates were a set of plates discovered in 1843 which were in fact a forgery created by three men (Bridge Whitten, Robert Wiley, and Wilburn Fugate).
- The Voree plates (sometimes called the "Record of Rajah Manchou of Vorito" or the "Voree Record") were a set of plates discovered and later translated by James Strang in 1845. Alleged to be a forgery.
- The plates of Laban were a set of plates that were described as being the Brass Plates discovered by and later cited as the source of the Book of the Law of the Lord published in 1851 by James Strang.

== See also ==
- Latter Day Saint movement and engraved metal plates
