= Parable of the Olive Tree =

Allegory in The Book of Mormon

The Allegory of the Olive Tree is an extended allegory recounted in Chapter 5 of the Book of Jacob, the third book of the Book of Mormon. The narrative describes the parable as one of the teachings of Zenos found in the brass plates, a lost record. Latter Day Saints sometimes suggest that Paul in his Epistle to the Romans might be referencing a similar parable.

== Context ==
In Jacob 5, Jacob quotes the prophet Zenos, who says he is quoting the Lord. Zenos is believed by members of the Latter-day Saint movement to be a prophet from Israel or Judah who lived sometime after Abraham and before Lehi, and had writings included in the brass plates but not the Hebrew Bible, which became the Old Testament. Jacob shares this allegory following his statement in the previous chapter (Jacob 4) that he will explain how the Jews can be saved despite rejecting a "sure foundation."

== Narrative ==
The House of Israel is compared with a tame olive tree that grows old and begins to decay. The master of the vineyard has his servants care for the tree with the hope that it will grow new branches, and then has the young branches grafted elsewhere, where they grow good fruit. Branches from a wild olive tree are grafted into the original tree, and they also grow good fruit. The wild branches, over time, take over and the tree begins to grow bad fruit. The master is "grieved" and wonders what more he could have done. Next, the master has the natural branches and the wild branches grafted back into the original tree to save its roots, and the tree begins to grow good fruit again. The fruit of both kinds of branches becomes equally good. A final gathering of all the fruit will happen before the vineyard is burned. Jacob prophecies that the events described in the allegory will happen, saying that both the roots and the branches will be remembered. He pleads with the people to repent.

== Interpretation of the parable ==
Comparing Romans 11 and Jacob 5, Head of the School of Divinity and Religious Studies at the University of Aberdeen Seth Kunin writes that the difference between the two metaphors is that the Book of Mormon includes grafting in of other branches to an olive tree. Paul Hoskisson, Brigham Young University professor of ancient scripture, explains the allegory by associating tame olive tree with the House of Israel and the wild olive trees as non-Israelites, the vineyard is the world. The decay of the original, tame tree is connected with apostasy from the teachings of Jesus Christ. He associates the roots with several different ideas, including progenitors of Christ, covenants of the house of Israel, or the general gospel of Jesus Christ. Hoskisson also splits the parable into seven periods of time, comparing each with scriptural and historical events.

== Sources Cited ==
- Hardy, Grant, ed. (2023). The Annotated Book of Mormon. Oxford University Press. ISBN 978-0-19-008220-8. OL 46783409M. Wikidata Q122259222.
- Reiss, Jana (2005). The Book of Mormon: Sections Annotated and Explained. Woodstock, Vermont: Skylight Paths Publishing. ISBN 1-59473-076-8.
- Thomas, John Christopher (2016). A Pentecostal Reads the Book of Mormon: A Literary and Theological Introduction. CPT Press. ISBN 978-1-935931-55-3. Wikidata Q123196681.
