= World government (disambiguation) =

World government is the concept of a single political body that would make, interpret and enforce international law.

World government may also refer to:

- World Governments Summit, an annual event of government leaders
- World government (Mormonism), a prophecy in Mormon theology
- World Government (One Piece), the fictional world of One Piece
- World Government Party, a minor federalist political party in the United Kingdom
- Provisional World Government, a provisional government established by the Second World Constituent Assembly

== See also ==
- Cosmopolitanism
- Global governance
- International Court of Justice
- League of Nations
- New World Order (conspiracy theory)
- On World Government
- Salomon Smith Barney World Government Bond Index
- United Nations
- World Federalist Movement
- World state in Brave New World
