= Killing of Laban =

Story in the Book of Mormon

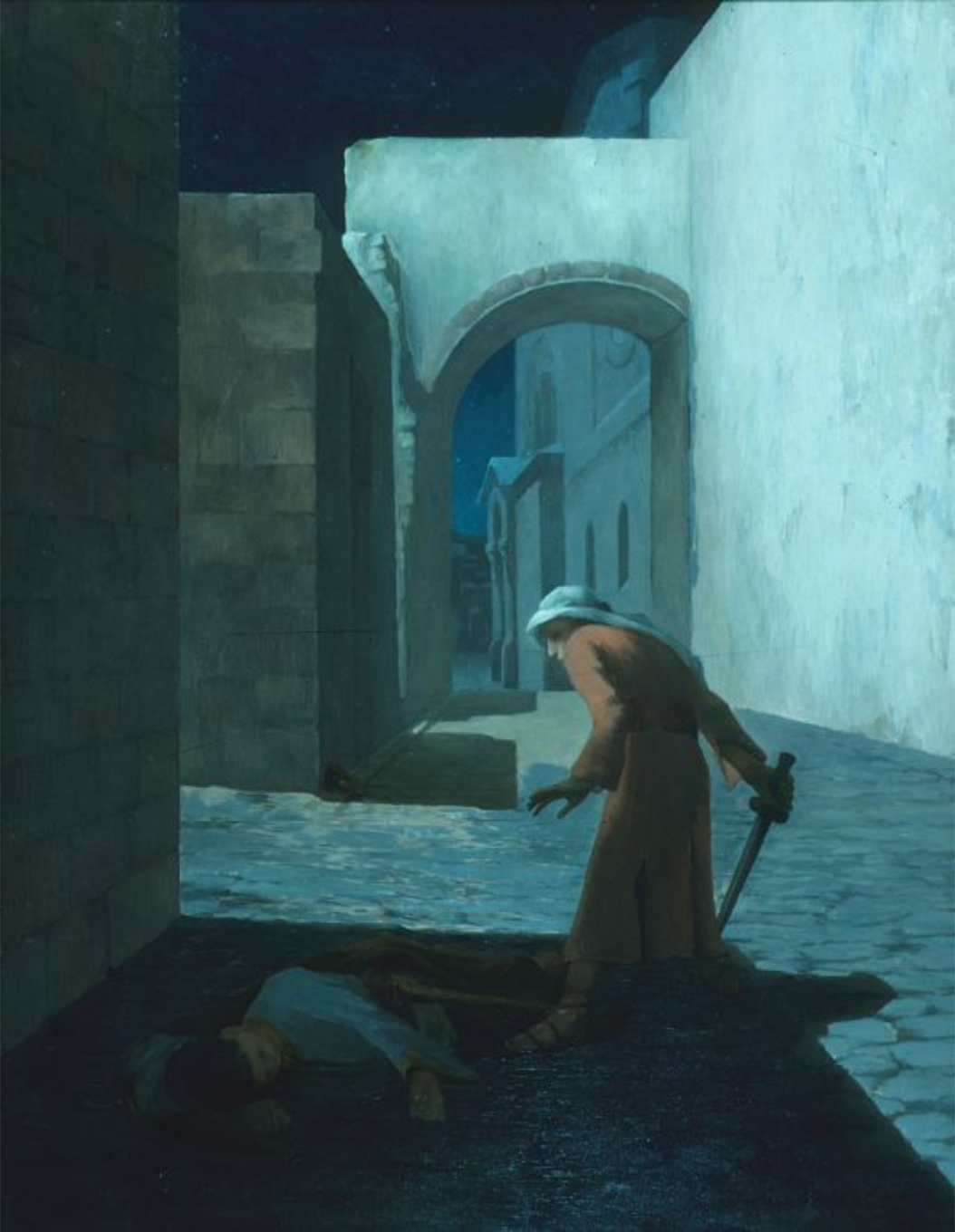
- H. H. Haag's Nephi and Laban (1894)
- Time: Night
- Era: Reign of Zedekiah
- Location: Jerusalem
- Participants: Nephi; Laban

The story of the killing of Laban, in which Nephi kills Laban, is found near the beginning of the Book of Mormon.

After the family of Lehi flees Jerusalem and sets up a camp in the wilderness, upon being commanded by God in a dream, Lehi sends his four sons back to Jerusalem to obtain a set of brass plates from a commander named Laban. Lehi believes that these plates will be necessary for his descendants to preserve their culture and religion in the new land they will inhabit. When Lehi's eldest son, Laman, meets with Laban, he refuses to give up the plates and attempts to have Laman killed.

Later, the four sons of Lehi offer to trade Lehi's wealth (gold, silver, and much riches) for the plates. Laban instead robs them of their property and sends men to kill them. In a third, late-night attempt, the youngest son, Nephi, encounters a drunken Laban passed out on the street in Jerusalem. Under direction from the Holy Spirit, Nephi reluctantly decapitates Laban with Laban's sword, and then impersonates him in order to obtain the brass plates. The ethical implications of Nephi, an important prophet in the Book of Mormon, taking a man's life in order to secure the long-term prosperity of his descendants have made this one of the most analyzed and debated passages of the Book of Mormon.

== Book of Mormon narrative ==
The story of Nephi obtaining the plates from Laban takes up all of the third and fourth chapters of the First Book of Nephi. In Chapter 3, Lehi tells Nephi that he has had a prophetic dream in which the Lord commanded him to send his four sons back to Jerusalem to obtain a set of brass plates held by a man named Laban. The plates contain "the record of the Jews," which, Lehi believes, his descendants will need when they establish a new civilization in the land that they will inherit. Lehi's other sons complain about the difficulty of the task, but Nephi accepts the task and proclaims, "I will go and do the things which the Lord hath commanded, for I know that the Lord giveth no commandments unto the children of men, save he shall prepare a way for them to accomplish the thing which he commandeth them." In the end, all four brothers—Laman, Lemuel, Sam, and Nephi—go to Jerusalem.

When they reach their destination, they cast lots to determine who will approach Laban, and the lot falls to Laman. When Laman asks for the plates, Laban becomes angry, calls Laman a robber, and threatens to have him killed before Laman escapes and returns to his brothers. At Nephi's suggestion, they go to their father's house and gather gold, silver, and other valuable items and offer them to Laban in exchange for the plates. Laban takes possession of the items, and then orders his servants to kill the brothers. They escape with their lives but do not obtain the plates. At this point, Laman and Lemuel become angry with Nephi and Sam and began to beat them with a rod. An angel appears and tells the other brothers that God has chosen Nephi to rule over them and commands that they return immediately to Jerusalem, where the Lord will deliver Laban into their hands.

In Chapter Four, Nephi goes alone to Laban's house. On his way, he sees Laban himself drunk with wine and lying in the street. He draws Laban's sword and admires its workmanship. And then he is "constrained by the spirit" that he should kill Laban and take the plates. He says in his heart "Never at any time have I shed the blood of a man. And I shrunk and would that I might not slay him. But the Spirit is insistent, saying, "it is better that one man should perish than that a nation should dwindle and perish in unbelief." Nephi decapitates Laban with his own sword and then dresses in the slain man's clothing. Speaking in Laban's voice, he orders a servant named Zoram to retrieve the plates. When Zoram recognizes Nephi as an imposter, Nephi compels him to swear obedience and offers to spare his life if he (Zoram) agrees to join the Lehite party in the wilderness.

== Significance of the event ==
The story of Nephi killing Laban has occasioned an enormous amount of commentary both defending and criticizing Nephi's actions. In Understanding the Book of Mormon, Grant Hardy acknowledges that Nephi's actions, "without a considerable amount of explanation, would look a lot like murder and robbery." Nephi kills Laban when he is unarmed and unable to defend himself and then takes possession of the plates through deception and force. BYU religion professor Charles Swift asks, "How can we justify a man coming upon another man lying in a street, completely helpless . . . and that first man decapitating the second man, stealing his sword and clothing, and then impersonating him so he could steal a most precious item from his treasury."

Mormon literary critic Eugene England analyzes the incident through the writings of French critic Rene Girard, who analyzed the figure of the scapegoat in ancient narratives. England sees the spirit's justification for the killing of Laban--"it is better that one man should perish than that a nation should dwindle and perish in unbelief"—as "a classic statement of the scapegoating rationale." Girard claims that this rationale is "the foundation of human violence and is absolutely repudiated by Christ." England goes on to say that "Nephi, recounting the killing of Laban many years after it happened, quotes the Spirit using exactly the same words as the Jewish priest Caiaphas used in an ends-justifies-means argument to condemn Christ." We must, England concludes, read Nephi's justifications for killing Laban as typical, but flawed, ancient arguments about the need to scapegoat victims in order to protect society.

Yet, Old Testament instances of the "one perish to save many" principle exist in the case of Sheba, who was guilty of treason and beheaded by the people of Abel in order to save themselves from Joab (2 Samuel 20), and King Jehoiakim's "sacrifice" by the Sanhedrin to King Nebuchadnezzar in order to stave off a Babylonian invasion (2 Chronicles 36:6, see also Jehoiakim, In Rabbinic Literature)

Critics of the Book of Mormon have frequently pointed to Nephi's killing of Laban as an example of divinely sanctioned violence in Mormon scripture that contributed to violent rhetoric and doctrines in Mormon history. Literary critic J. Aaron Sanders argues that the "Nephi archetype" in the Mormon mythos led directly to the development of the doctrine of blood atonement. "The story of Nephi killing Laban contributed three key elements to the Mormon mythos," Sanders proposes. "(1) Nephi as an archetypal Mormon hero; (2) righteous murder committed by that hero, or blood atonement; and (3) the rhetorical justification for blood atonement." In Under the Banner of Heaven, Jon Krakauer cites this passage from the Book of Mormon as an important influence on the Lafferty brothers when they murdered their niece and sister in law. Dan Lafferty claimed to have received a revelation comparing him to Nephi, and "this revelation had a tremendous impact on Dan: after God had declared that he was like Nephi . . . Dan 'was willing to do anything that the Lord commanded him.'"

== Interpretations of Nephi's actions ==
Some literary scholars of the Book of Mormon have used this incident to question Nephi's reliability as a narrator. Grant Hardy has written that Nephi's narrative was written long after the events actually happened "from the spiritual and political needs of thirty years later". Nephi had compelling reasons to shade events in his favor by overemphasizing God's role in the decision to kill Laban and underemphasizing his own. Furthermore, Hardy argues, when Nephi returns to his parents after killing Laban and appropriating the plates, his narrative remains suspiciously silent about Lehi's opinion of the events, concluding that "it is difficult to avoid the suspicion that something is being suppressed here." Eugene England further suggests, on evidence that he finds in the later portions of the narrative, "that throughout his life Nephi continued to be deeply troubled by something that may have been--or included--the killing of Laban."

=== Utilitarian necessity ===
The most common defense of Nephi's killing of Laban comes from the angel's words to Lehi's sons that it is better for one man to die than for a nation to perish in unbelief. The official LDS Institute Manual emphasizes the importance of the brass plates to future generations of Lehi's descendants. "The Lord wanted Lehi and his descendants to have the scriptural record even if “'one man should perish' . . . for it to happen," the manual states. "The brass plates blessed not only the Nephite and Mulekite nations, but they led to some of the written portions of the gold plates as well... The Book of Mormon has blessed and will bless the lives of millions of people and nations. Ultimately, all this was at stake when Nephi stood over Laban and followed the voice of the Spirit."

In a 2020 article in the official LDS publication, the Ensign, Clyde J. Williams emphasis the utilitarian calculus of the act, which weighed the interests of one person against the interests of a whole people, or "one life lost versus many". Nephi recognized that the record "would help preserve his people’s language and that his posterity would need to know the commandments in order to keep them," Williams claims. "Without the brass plates, they would not have the prophets’ words. Nephi also knew by the Spirit that the Lord had delivered Laban into his hands and that it was 'better that one man should perish than that a nation should dwindle and perish in unbelief.'"

Other Latter-day Saint scholars have urged caution with the implied premise of the utilitarian argument that God had no other options available for getting the plates to Nephi. "While there is no question that the possession of the plates was important to Nephi and his people," suggests Charles Swift, "we must be careful not to ignore the unlimited alternative ways to acquire the plates without Nephi having to kill Laban." Joseph Spencer adds, "it doesn't require much imagination to think of ways God might have made escape possible without such drastic measures."

=== Justifiable homicide ===
Many commenters have pointed to Laban's actions towards Nephi and his brothers as at least a partial justification for Nephi's actions. LDS Apostle Jeffrey R. Holland, writing in 1976 when he was the Church Education Commissioner, argued that Laban "has not been guiltless in his dealings with Lehi’s family." Holland points to five offenses that Laban committed against Nephi and his brothers: "Laban has at least: (1) been unfaithful in keeping the commandments of God; (2) falsely accused Laman of robbery; (3) coveted Lehi’s property as a greedy, “lustful” man; (4) stolen that property outright; and (5) sought twice to kill Nephi and/or his brothers." Clyde J. Williams gives a similar list of offenses as states that "As Nephi looked upon this man who had sought their lives, the Spirit constrained him to slay Laban."

In an extensive analysis titled "Legal Perspectives on the Slaying of Laban," LDS legal scholar Jack Welch cites Mosaic Law to suggest that Nephi's actions did not rise to the level of premeditated murder and should instead be considered a "protected manslaughter" rather than a "criminal homicide." Welch further argues that Laban's false accusations against the brothers, and his attempt to kill them under false pretenses, would have acted as factors mitigating Nephi's guilt. "Laban effectively stood as a false accuser," Welch insists. "Such an accusation, coming from a commanding officer of the city, was more than an idle insult; it carried the force of a legal indictment. Since Nephi and his brothers were powerless to rectify that wrong, God was left to discharge justice against Laban."

=== Obedience ===
Most defenders of Nephi's actions, for whatever other reasons, ultimately rest with the argument that God commanded Nephi to kill Laban and that God rightfully has power over life and death. "In the end," Welch concludes, "Laban was killed for one and only one reason, namely because the Spirit of the Lord commanded it and constrained Nephi to slay him." Swift concurs: "In my view, there is only one justification for what Nephi did: God commanded him to kill Laban." And Holland concludes that, ultimately, the moral of the story is that one should always obey God: "It would seem, finally, that obedience to divine revelation, not death, is the focal point of this story. God can restore life in time and eternity; he can do almost nothing with willful disobedience. The quality of our obedience to God’s commandments is still the clearest expression of the quality of our faith in him."

== Literary and artistic representations ==
The ambiguity and complexity of the story and its interpretations make it a favorite of Latter-day Saint writers and artists. These representations range from the allegorical or metaphorical (for instance, the murder of Gaballufix in Orson Scott Card's The Memory of Earth), to those expanding or exploring the story as written by Nephi. For instance, in a 2023 issue of Irreantum focused on fiction and poetry exploring stories from scripture, the killing of Laban was merely referenced to suggest the extremes of Nephi's experience ("To follow spirit, // Through alley or wilderness. / To stand, to face, to trust in grace."); was used as an opportunity to explore questions of agency, obedience, priesthood, and the divine feminine by presenting a second angel with a separate message; seen from the perspective of Nephi's mother; and an apologetic set of circumstances that make Laban a more willing victim.

== Connections to the Bible ==
Many commenters have framed Nephi's killing of Laban as an "Abrahamic Test," pointing out that, like Abraham's binding of Isaac, Nephi was commanded to go against his nature to take a life. "What if it was an Abrahamic test, like the command to Abraham to kill Isaac?" asks Eugene England in "Why Nephi Killed Laban." "What if it was designed to push Nephi to the limits of the paradox of obedience and integrity to teach him and all readers of the Book of Mormon something very troubling but still very true about the universe and the natural requirements of establishing a saving relationship with God?" In a 1989 address at Brigham Young University, Jeffrey Holland argued similarly that "if Nephi cannot yield to this terribly painful command, if he cannot bring himself to obey, then it is entirely probable that he can never succeed or survive the tasks that lie just ahead." Spencer also noted the similarity to the Abrahamic test, asking if killing Laban was a test to show Nephi that the religious exceeds the ethical in the same way the ethical exceeds the legal.

Charles Swift acknowledges that the biggest difference between the Nephi/Laban and Abraham/Isaac narratives is that Abraham did not actually kill Isaac. An angel stays his hand at the last minute, and the Lord provides a ram in a thicket for the sacrifice. "For Nephi," Swift points out, "there was no ram in the thicket." Some commentators see a better biblical parallel in the story of Moses killing an Egyptian overseer who was beating a Hebrew slave (Exodus 2:11-12). "Nephi was not the only prophet in scripture to shed a man's blood," writes Jack Welch. "Moses killed an Egyptian when Moses saw the Egyptian beating a Hebrew slave; when he looked around and saw that no one was watching, Moses killed the Egyptian and buried him in the sand."

In a 2013 article, literary critic Elizabeth Fenton suggests that the story of Nephi finding his enemy Laban asleep "recalls the well-known biblical tale of David finding Saul asleep in 1 Samuel. Although the stories end quite differently—David spares Saul, while Nephi decapitates Laban—the similarity of language is unmistakable." Fenton argues that this dynamic repeats throughout the Book of Mormon, as its narratives align with biblical narratives up to a point, but then replaces the narrative with a new and substantially different version. "The Book of Mormon threatens to supplant the story of David with that of Nephi," she concludes. This moment of iteration . . . carries the trace of the older text while simultaneously overmatching it. In the service of record keeping, Nephi will do what David would not."
