= Book of Jacob =

Third book in the Book of Mormon

The Book of Jacob: The Brother of Nephi (/ˈdʒeɪkəb/), usually referred to as the Book of Jacob, is the third of fifteen books that make up the Book of Mormon, a sacred text within the Latter Day Saint movement.

== Structure ==
According to the text, it was written by the ancient prophet Jacob, younger brother of Nephi. While this book contains some history of the Nephites, including the death of Nephi, it is mainly a record of Jacob's preaching to his people. Chapter 5 contains the Parable of the Olive Tree, a lengthy allegory of the scattering and gathering of Israel, comparing the Israelites and gentiles to tame and wild olive trees, respectively. Jacob is seven chapters long.

According to Grant Hardy, professor of religious studies, Jacob 4-6 mirrors the structure of Nephi's teachings in Second Nephi. He begins with a testimony of Christ, quotes the Brass Plates, and interprets what he has shared. Jacob's focus, unlike Nephi's focus on Isaiah, is on Zenos.

== Narrative ==
The book of Jacob can be divided into four parts:

Summary	Chapters and verses
Transition to Jacob's leadership	1
Jacob's sermon in the temple	2-3
Jacob's prophetic knowledge and the allegory of the olive tree	4-6
Anti-Christ Sherem, Nephite militarization, and Jacob's farewell	7

=== Transition to Jacob's leadership ===
The prophet Nephi grows old and transfers record keeping responsibility to Jacob. He instructs Jacob to only record spiritually important events, and Jacob writes that the goal of his writing is to convince the people to "come unto Christ." Nephi dies, and rulers succeeding him are called "second" and "third" Nephi respectively. Jacob explains that he uses the term "Nephite" to refer to anyone who is friendly to the people of Nephi.

=== Jacob's sermon in the temple ===
Jacob offers a speech in the temple in his office of priest and teacher. He identifies three wicked practices among the Nephites: desiring polygamy, or multiple wives, searching out gold and silver, and being prideful. To combat these tendencies, Jacob counsels the people to free captive people and take care of the hungry, poor, and sick. He says that the practice of having multiple wives injures women. He compares the Nephites unfavorably with the Lamanites.

=== Jacob's prophetic knowledge and the allegory of the olive tree ===
Jacob expounds on the purpose of the plates and his knowledge of Christ and the resurrection, and how the Jews will reject Christ. Then he tells the allegory of the olive tree, citing it from Zenos, an extra-Biblical prophet quoted by multiple writers in the Book of Mormon. The story describes the Gathering of Israel in the last days, where the house of Israel is a tame olive tree whose branches partially die. Throughout the allegory, the master of the vineyard tries to revive the olive tree by grafting in wild branches in order to preserve its fruit. For a time this plan succeeds, but the wild branches get into the tree's roots and the fruit becomes bad. Both wild and tame branches are grafted onto the tree, which saves it and its fruit. In a final harvest, the vineyard will be burned. After recounting the allegory, Jacob promises that it is true and calls his readers to repentance.

=== Anti-Christ Sherem, Nephite militarization, and Jacob's farewell ===
The final section in the book tells the story of an antichrist named Sherem, who preaches that there will be no Christ, tells Jacob that no one can know the future, and asks him for a sign. Jacob prays, and God smites Sherem, who later confesses that he was lying about Christ and then dies. Subsequently the Nephites become righteous again and attempt to convert the Lamanites to their religion. According to Jacob, the Lamanites hated the Nephites and liked killing them, and the Nephites learned how to defend themselves. When Jacob finishes writing on the plates, he bequeaths them to his son Enos.

== Interpretation and themes ==
=== Nephite organization ===
Jacob's narrative shows that Nephi's duties were divided as he passed them on. A man whose identity is not specified was named king and took up the name Nephi and Nephi's brothers, Jacob and Joseph, were consecrated as priests. Jacob was assigned the task of recording on the small plates. Jacob shares that they kept the Law of Moses and looked forward to Christ's coming. He also writes that they quickly gained prosperity.

=== Equality and kinship ===
In her chapter on kinship in the Book of Mormon published in Oxford press's Americanist Approaches, Nancy Bentley, a professor of English at the University of Pennsylvania specializing in kinship in 19th-century America, analyzes Jacob's speech. Jacob writes that God forbids polygamy to the Nephites in order to prioritize family harmony over multiple wives. While this was part of a larger argument the Book of Mormon makes in favor of valuing kinship relationships over contractual ones, it also made God the arbiter of moral family relationships. Jacob also argues that the difference in skin color between Nephites and Lamanites is not a biological property, but an external marker of whether or not individuals follow the "family-based spirituality" of the Nephites.

To explain the need for his temple discourse, Jacob cites an issue with pride and inequality among the Nephites. He teaches them that to become like God, they must work towards divine principles such as equality, additionally suggesting the need to rid themselves of inaccurate views of themselves and others. To overcome negative human tendency, the people must turn to God. Christian theology professor Deidre Nicole Green theorizes on Jacob's emphasis to treat everyone as your neighbor, that it is vital to think of all others as equal in order to have charity towards them. Green proposes, "Charity is not just tolerance."

==== Sexual fidelity ====
Jacob, says Green, preaches on different points of pride for the Nephites since they claim superiority over the Lamanites. One of these issues he points out is that the Lamanite women appear to be more respected than Nephite women, also suggesting that Lamanite families are more righteous in their love for each other. While the Nephites have begun to follow David and Solomon's examples of having multiple women, according to Jacob, this practice has "broken the hearts" of their wives and lost them the confidence of their children. He insists they should follow the Lamanite example of sexual fidelity and have only one wife and no concubines. Jacob's firm condemnation of the Nephites taking up plural marriage is surprising to some readers given polygamy practices of the Latter-day Saint movement during the 1800s.

The second chapter of Jacob, in verse thirty, contains what many believers during the 1800s saw as the allowance for polygamy. It says that God can command periods of plural marriage as an exception to his law. Journalist and religious studies scholar Jana Reiss writes that Latter-day Saints believe the 1830s are an example of such a period, which ended in 1904 when the Church of Jesus Christ of Latter-day Saints announced any members practicing polygamy would be excommunicated. Some churches which are part of the Latter-day Saint movement still take part in this practice.

=== Sherem ===
Riess contrasts Sherem with biblical instances of Ish Elohim, different anonymous "men of God" who appear to a leader and inform them of a needed change. The story often involves a sign of the Ish Elohim's prophetic status and revolves around God's punishment to those who take part in false worship. Sherem, according to Riess, is an "upholder of the law" and reproaches Jacob for leaving behind the established religion by preaching of a Christ. Despite this alignment with the "man of God" outline, Jacob includes more information about Sherem than is typically included in the anonymous Ish Elohim stories. Additionally, rather than revealing a sign of his prophetic calling, Sherem demands a sign and Jacob demonstrates his own calling.

Riess also compares Sherem's story to René Girard's scapegoat theory. The Nephites, she writes, were upset over some of Jacob's teachings regarding their sins. Just as two brothers fighting over a toy unite again after insulting a common enemy, Sherem's story may have been vital to bring the Nephites onto common ground.

Comparative religion researcher Jacob Rennaker identifies that Sherem's smiting is never directly attributed to God in the text. The description that he was suffering for "many days" before dying may suggest inner turmoil and "self-inflicted madness".

== Significant textual variants ==
The book was titled "Book of Jacob: Brother of Nephi" in the first edition of the Book of Mormon.

== Works cited ==
- Berkey, Kimberly; Spencer, Joseph (2019). ""Great Cause to Morn": The Complexity of The Book of Mormon's Presentation of Gender and Race". In Fenton, Elizabeth; Hickman, Jared (eds.). Americanist Approaches to the Book of Mormon. Oxford University Press. ISBN 978-0-19-022192-8. Wikidata Q123497267.
- Bentley, Nancy (2019). "Kinship, The Book of Mormon, and Modern Revelation". In Fenton, Elizabeth; Hickman, Jared (eds.). Americanist Approaches to the Book of Mormon. Oxford University Press. ISBN 978-0-19-022192-8. Wikidata Q123497267.
- Fenton, Elizabeth; Hickman, Jared, eds. (2019). Americanist Approaches to the Book of Mormon. Oxford University Press. ISBN 978-0-19-022192-8. Wikidata Q123497267.
- Green, Deidre Green (2020). Jacob: A Brief Theological Introduction. Brief Theological Introductions. Maxwell Institute. ISBN 978-0-8425-0011-1. Wikidata Q124711622.
- Hardy, Grant, ed. (2023). The Annotated Book of Mormon. Oxford University Press. ISBN 978-0-19-008220-8. OL 46783409M. Wikidata Q122259222.
- Rennaker, Jacob (2017). ""Divine Dream Time". In Miller, Adam S.; Spencer, Joseph M. (eds.). Christ and Antichrist: reading Jacob 7. Neal A. Maxwell Institute. ISBN 978-0-8425-3004-0.
- Riess, Jana (2017). ""There Came a Man": Sherem, Scapegoating, and the Inversion of Prophetic Tradition". In Miller, Adam S.; Spencer, Joseph M. (eds.). Christ and Antichrist: reading Jacob 7. Neal A. Maxwell Institute. ISBN 978-0-8425-3004-0.
- Reiss, Jana (2005). The Book of Mormon: Sections Annotated and Explained. Woodstock, Vermont: Skylight Paths Publishing. ISBN 1-59473-076-8.
- Thomas, John Christopher (2016). A Pentecostal Reads the Book of Mormon: A Literary and Theological Introduction. CPT Press. ISBN 978-1-935931-55-3. Wikidata Q123196681.

Book of Jacob Small Plates of Nephi
Preceded by Second Nephi	Book of Mormon	Succeeded by Enos
