= Kinderhook, Illinois =

Kinderhook
- Village
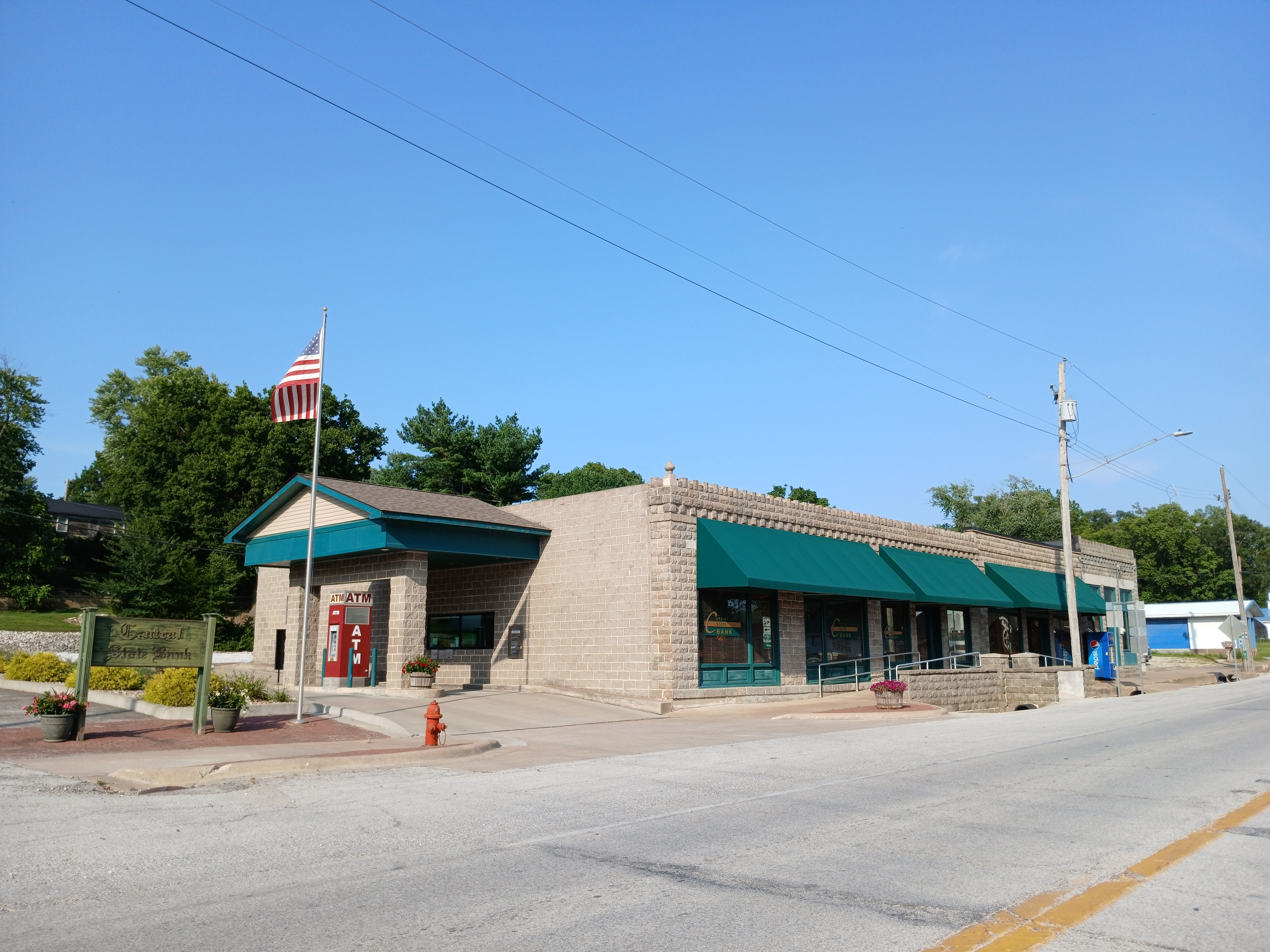
- Central Kinderhook, July 2024

- Location of Kinderhook in Pike County, Illinois.
- Coordinates: 39°42′14″N 91°09′09″W
- Country: United States
- State: Illinois
- County: Pike

Area
  - Total: 0.81 sq mi (2.09 km^{2})
  - Land: 0.81 sq mi (2.09 km^{2})
  - Water: 0 sq mi (0.00 km^{2})
- Elevation: 518 ft (158 m)

Population (2020)
  - Total: 189
  - Density: 234.1/sq mi (90.37/km^{2})
- Time zone: UTC-6 (CST)
  - Summer (DST): UTC-5 (CDT)
- ZIP code: 62345
- Area code: 217
- FIPS code: 17-39922
- GNIS feature ID: 2398349

Kinderhook is a village in Pike County, Illinois, United States. As of the 2020 census, Kinderhook had a population of 189.

== Geography ==
According to the 2010 census, Kinderhook has a total area of 0.88 square miles (2.28 km^{2}), all land.

== Demographics ==
Historical population
Census	Pop.	Note	%±
1880	394		—
1900	370		—
1910	371		0.3%
1920	332		−10.5%
1930	318		−4.2%
1940	336		5.7%
1950	299		−11.0%
1960	276		−7.7%
1970	281		1.8%
1980	259		−7.8%
1990	257		−0.8%
2000	249		−3.1%
2010	216		−13.3%
2020	189		−12.5%
U.S. Decennial Census

As of the census of 2000, there were 249 people, 101 households, and 73 families residing in the village. The population density was 281.7 inhabitants per square mile (108.8/km^{2}). There were 113 housing units at an average density of 127.8 per square mile (49.3/km^{2}). The racial makeup of the village was 98.39% White, 0.40% African American, and 1.20% from two or more races. Hispanic or Latino of any race were 1.61% of the population.

There were 101 households, out of which 38.6% had children under the age of 18 living with them, 60.4% were married couples living together, 9.9% had a female householder with no husband present, and 27.7% were non-families. 24.8% of all households were made up of individuals, and 14.9% had someone living alone who was 65 years of age or older. The average household size was 2.47 and the average family size was 2.90.

In the village, the population was spread out, with 27.7% under the age of 18, 8.0% from 18 to 24, 28.1% from 25 to 44, 24.5% from 45 to 64, and 11.6% who were 65 years of age or older. The median age was 36 years. For every 100 females, there were 111.0 males. For every 100 females age 18 and over, there were 95.7 males.

The median income for a household in the village was $38,438, and the median income for a family was $41,875. Males had a median income of $22,500 versus $16,750 for females. The per capita income for the village was $16,328. About 1.3% of families and 6.3% of the population were below the poverty line, including none of those under the age of eighteen and 12.0% of those sixty five or over.

== History ==
In 1843, the Kinderhook Plates were "discovered" near this town.
