= Kinderhook plates =

Brass pieces created as an archaeological hoax

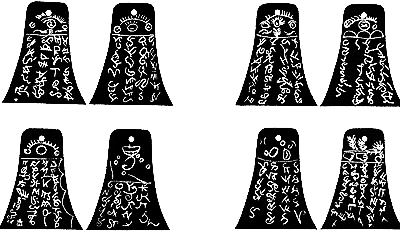
Front and back of four of the six Kinderhook plates are shown in these facsimiles, which appeared in History of the Church.

The Kinderhook plates are a set of six small, bell-shaped pieces of brass with unusual engravings, created as a hoax in 1843, surreptitiously buried and then dug up at a Native American mound near Kinderhook, Illinois, United States. The plates were forged by three men from Kinderhook as part of a plan to discredit Latter Day Saint movement founder Joseph Smith. According to Mormonism, the Book of Mormon is a record of the ancient Judeo-Semitic inhabitants of the Americas, originally translated by Smith from golden plates engraved in the language of reformed Egyptian.

Latter Day Saint residents of Kinderhook sent the plates to Smith in Nauvoo for translation, where Smith said they were of ancient origin and translated a portion of them. The Church of Jesus Christ of Latter-day Saints (LDS Church) defended the plates until 1981. In 1980, scientific testing confirmed the hoax, and that the plates were a modern creation. Within the Latter Day Saint movement, Smith's translation was never accepted in the canon of scripture, but was generally considered authentic.

== Background ==
In the late 1830s, followers of the nascent Latter Day Saint movement had been expelled from Missouri and were settling in and around modern-day Nauvoo, Illinois. By 1842, there was a congregation of around one hundred Latter Day Saints located several miles south of the village of Kinderhook. Two residents of Kinderhook, a farmer named Wilburn Fugate and a merchant named Robert Wiley, were proselytized by missionaries using the Parley Pratt tract A Voice of Warning, which used the phrase, "Truth would spring up out of the earth." Fugate and Wiley decided to "prove the prophecy by way of a joke" and enlisted the help of Bridge Whitton, the village's postmaster and blacksmith, to create a set of six small plates of brass. In an 1879 letter to James T. Cobb, Fugate wrote of their creation:

Bridge Whitton cut them (the plates) out of some pieces of copper; Wiley and I made the hieroglyphics by making impressions on beeswax and filling them with acid and putting it on the plates. When they were finished we put them together with rust made of nitric acid, old iron and lead, and bound them with a piece of hoop iron, covering them completely with rust.

The purpose in creating the hoax has been debated. It is frequently presented as being a trap for Joseph Smith, to expose his translating abilities or lack thereof. Local recollections indicate that the creators of the hoax never intended for the plates to be delivered to Smith for translation, but as more of a community prank. Fugate himself stated the purpose was "simply for a joke" on the Latter Day Saint congregants, and one of his sons said that rather than being an elaborate trap for Smith it was "a little plan by which to startle the natives."

== Purported discovery ==
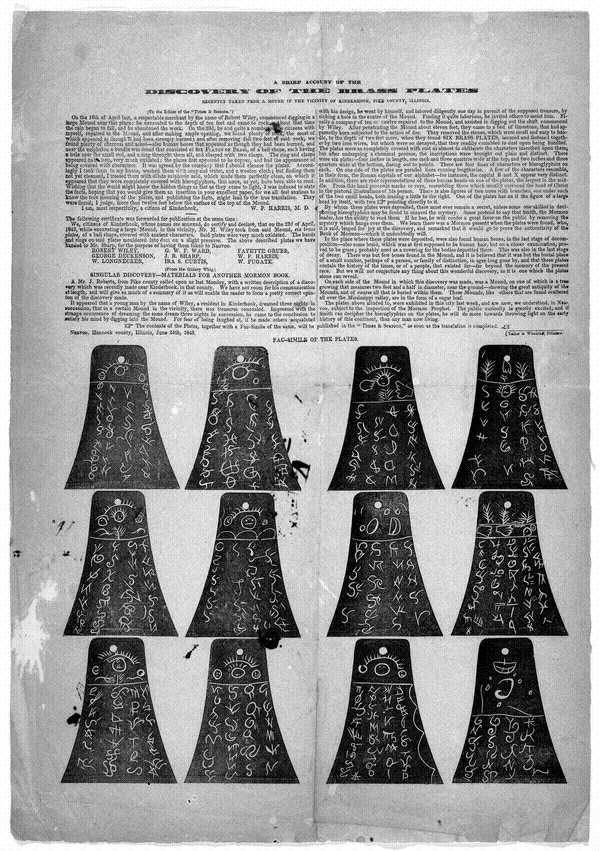
Broadside of facsimile of all six plates published June 24th 1843 in the Nauvoo Neighbor.

On April 16, 1843, Wiley began to dig a deep shaft in the center of an Indian mound near Kinderhook. It was reported in the Quincy Whig that the reason for his sudden interest in archaeology was that he had dreamed on three consecutive nights that there was treasure buried beneath the mound. At first, Wiley undertook the excavation alone, and reached a depth of about 10 feet (3.0 m) before he abandoned the work, finding it too laborious an undertaking.

On April 23, Wiley returned with a group of ten or twelve companions to assist him. They soon reached a bed of limestone, apparently charred by fire. Another 2 feet (61 cm) down, they discovered human bones, also charred, and "six plates of brass of a bell shape, each having a hole near the small end, and a ring through them all, and clasped with two clasps". A member of the excavation team, W. P. Harris, took the plates home, washed them, and treated them with sulphuric acid. Once they were clean, they were found to be covered in strange characters resembling hieroglyphics.

The plates were briefly exhibited in Kinderhook before they were sent on to Smith, who had said he had translated the Book of Mormon from a similar set of buried golden plates in 1830. The finders of the Kinderhook plates, and the general public, were keen to know if Smith would be able to decipher the symbols on these new plates as well. The Times and Seasons, a Latter Day Saint publication, stated that the existence of the Kinderhook plates lent further credibility to the authenticity of the Book of Mormon. Pratt wrote that the plates contained Egyptian engravings and "the genealogy of one of the ancient Jaredites back to Ham the son of Noah."

== Smith's response ==
Several sources suggest Smith made an attempt to translate the plates. William Clayton, Smith's private secretary, recorded that upon receiving the Kinderhook plates Smith sent for his "Hebrew Bible & Lexicon". On May 1, Clayton wrote in his journal:

I have seen 6 brass plates [...] covered with ancient characters of language containing from 30 to 40 on each side of the plates. Prest J. [Joseph Smith] has translated a portion and says they contain the history of the person with whom they were found and he was a descendant of Ham through the loins of Pharaoh king of Egypt, and that he received his kingdom from the ruler of heaven and earth.

Apostles John Taylor and Wilford Woodruff, editors of the Nauvoo Neighbor, implied Smith had started and would complete a translation and promised in a June 1843 article that said, "The contents of the plates, together with a Fac-simile of the same, will be published in the 'Times and Seasons,' as soon as the translation is completed."

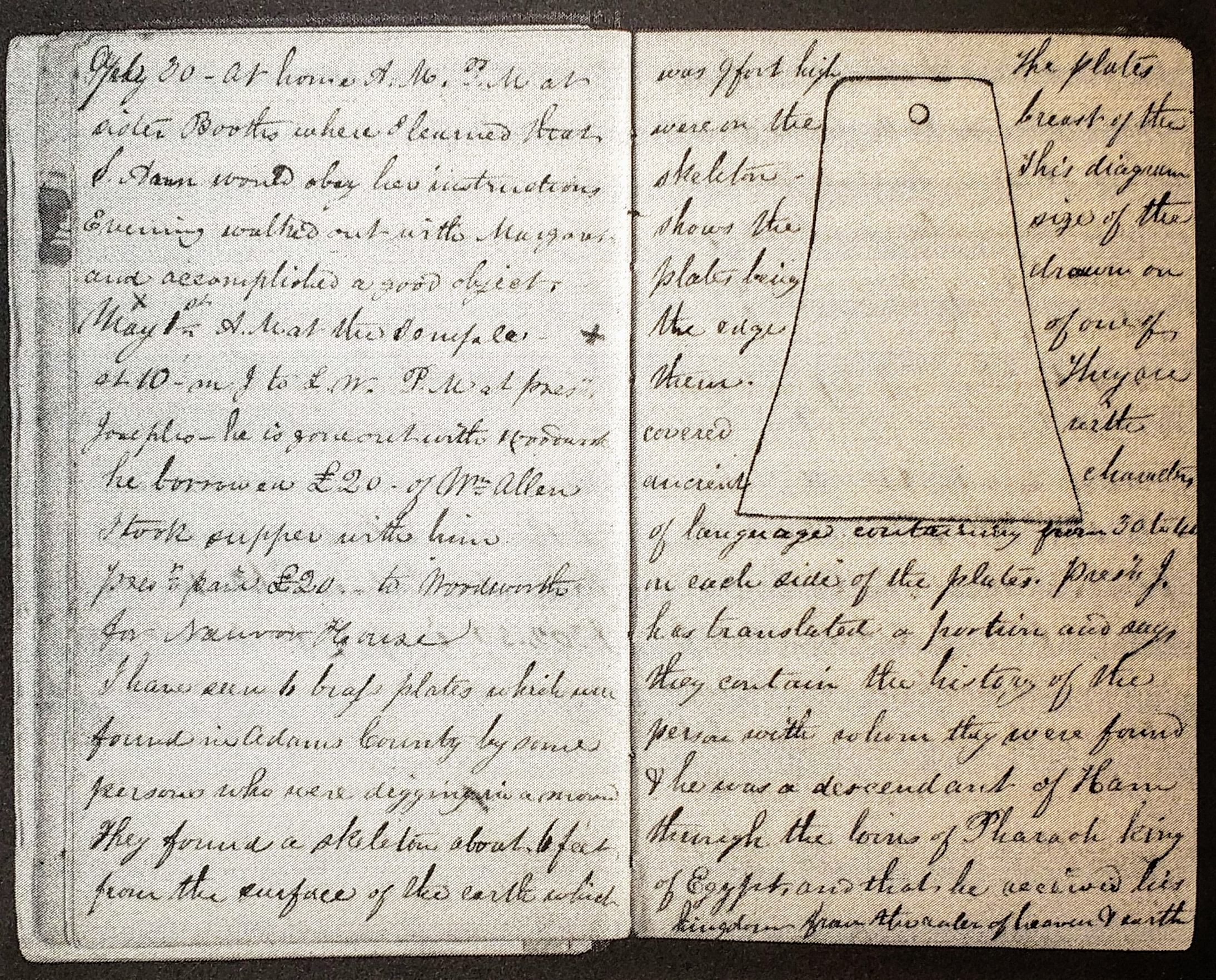
Page from William Clayton Diary, with tracing of a plate, and Smith's translation

The History of the Church also states Smith said the following:

I have translated a portion of [the plates] and find they contain the history of the person with whom they were found. He was a descendant of Ham, through the loins of Pharaoh, king of Egypt, and that he received his kingdom from the ruler of heaven and earth.

Stanley B. Kimball says the statement found in History of the Church could have been an altered version of Clayton's statement, placing Smith in the first person.

=== Connection with the Grammar and Alphabet of the Egyptian Language ===
A number of translation documents were created in 1835 in connection with the translation of the Book of Abraham, one of which is called the Grammar and Alphabet of the Egyptian Language (GAEL). One anonymous contemporary news correspondent spoke highly of Smith and said in their presence Smith had compared the characters on the plates to "his Egyptian alphabet" and they appeared to be the same. In a May 7, 1843, letter to a friend, Pratt wrote, "A large number of Citizens have seen them and compared the characters with those on the Egyptian papyrus which is now in this city." A sympathetic letter, also dated May 7, 1843, and published in the New York Herald for May 30, 1843, presents further evidence:

The plates are evidently brass, and are covered on both sides with hyerogliphics. They were brought up and shown to Joseph Smith. He compared them, in my presence, with his Egyptian Alphabet...and they are evidently the same characters. He therefore will be able to decipher them [...] You may expect something very remarkable pretty soon.

A prominent character from one of the plates matches well with a character in the GAEL, and the translation of that character in the GAEL compares with the description given by Clayton.

Kinderhook Plate character	Egyptian Language character

William Clayton's description	Egyptian Language character translation
...he was a descendant of Ham, through the loins of Pharaoh, King of Egypt, and that he received his kingdom through the ruler of heaven and earth.	...honor by birth, kingly power by the line of Pharoah. possession by birth one who riegns [sic] upon his throne universally— possessor of heaven and earth, and of the blessings of the earth.

== Rediscovery, analysis, and classification as a hoax ==
The Kinderhook plates were presumed lost, but for decades the Church of Jesus Christ of Latter-day Saints (LDS Church) published facsimiles of them in its official History of the Church. In 1920, one of the plates came into the possession of the Chicago Historical Society (now the Chicago History Museum). In 1966, this remaining plate was tested at Brigham Young University. The inscriptions matched facsimiles of the plate published contemporaneously, but the question remained whether this was an original Kinderhook plate or a later copy.

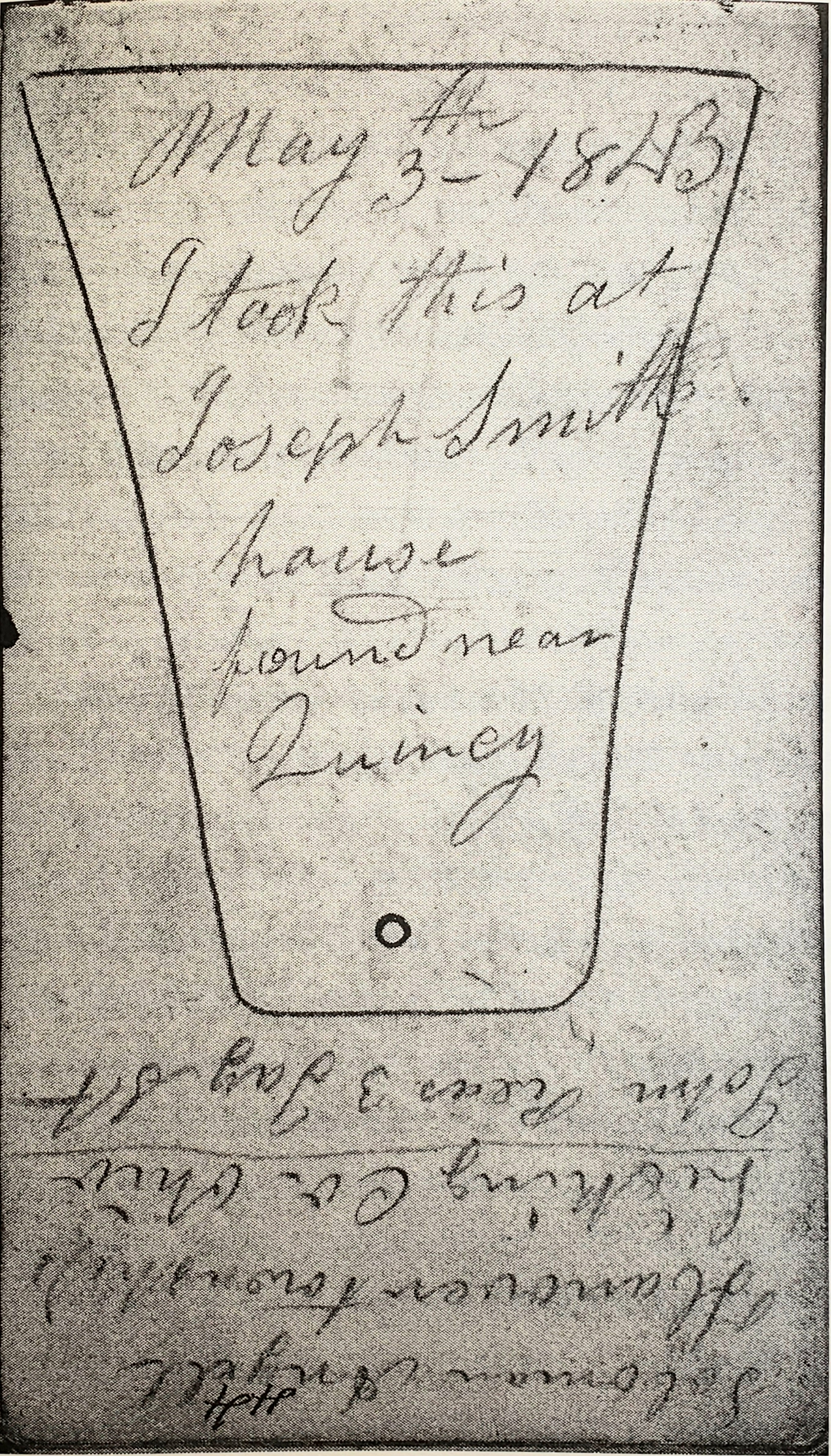
Kinderhook Plate outline traced in Brigham Young's Journal on 3 May 1843. Young saw and handled the plates in Joseph Smith's home on that day.

Though there was little evidence of whether the Kinderhook plates were ancient or a contemporary fabrication, some within the LDS Church believed them to be genuine. The September 1962 Improvement Era, an official magazine of the church, ran an article by Welby W. Ricks stating that the plates were genuine. In 1979, apostle Mark E. Petersen wrote a book called Those Gold Plates!. In the first chapter, Peterson describes various ancient cultures that have written records on metal plates, claiming: "There are the Kinderhook plates, too, found in America and now in the possession of the Chicago Historical Society. Controversy has surrounded these plates and their engravings, but most experts agree they are of ancient vintage."

In 1980, Professor D. Lynn Johnson of the Department of Materials Science and Engineering at Northwestern University examined the remaining plate. Using microscopy and various scanning devices, he determined that the tolerances and composition of its metal proved entirely consistent with the facilities available in a 19th-century blacksmith's shop and, more importantly, found traces of nitrogen in what were clearly nitric acid-etched grooves. In addition, he discovered evidence that this particular plate was among those examined by early Mormons, including Smith, and not a later copy. One of the features of the plate was the presence of small dents in the surface caused by a hexagonally-shaped tool. Johnson noticed that one of these dents had inadvertently been interpreted in the facsimile as a stroke in one of the characters. If the plate owned by the Chicago Historical Society had been a copy made from the facsimiles in History of the Church, that stroke in that character would have been etched, like the rest of the characters. He concluded that this plate was one that Smith examined, that it was not of ancient origin, and that it was in fact etched with acid, not engraved, confirming Fugate's 1879 description.

In 1981, the official magazine of the LDS Church ran an article stating that the plates were a hoax, and asserted that there was no proof that Smith made any attempt to translate the plates under the direction of God, in the way he had with the Book of Mormon: "There is no evidence that the Prophet Joseph Smith ever took up the matter with the Lord, as he did when working with the Book of Mormon and the Book of Abraham".

== See also ==
- The Greek Psalter Incident
- List of plates in Mormonism
- List of religious hoaxes
- Mark Hofmann
- Voree plates
- Zelph
