= Book of the Law of the Lord =

Scripture used by the Church of Jesus Christ of Latter Day Saints (Strangite)

The Book of the Law of the Lord
- Author: Part of the Law given to Moses at Mount Sinai according LDS teaching
- Translator: James Strang
- Language: English
- Publication place: United States
- Media type: Print (Hardback & Paperback)

The Book of the Law of the Lord is a sacred book of scripture used by the Church of Jesus Christ of Latter Day Saints (Strangite), a sect of the Latter Day Saint movement. It is alleged to be a translation by the Strangite prophet James Strang of the brass Plates of Laban, which were originally acquired by Nephi, a leading figure in the early portion of the Book of Mormon. Strang claimed to have translated them using the Urim and Thummim, which Mormons believe was used by Joseph Smith to translate the Book of Mormon from ancient gold plates. Strang's followers believe that while the Book of the Law was lost to the Old World during Israel's captivity in foreign lands, a copy was included in the plates that the ancient prophet Nephi took with him to the New World.

The book contains an elaborate constitution for a theocratic kingdom, in which the prophet-leader of the Latter Day Saint church equally rules as king over God's kingdom on earth. The expanded version also contains various other revelations and teachings added by Strang to explain it.

The Book of the Law of the Lord was not viewed as a sacred text by any Mormon denomination other than the Strangite church, until April 6, 2019 when the Church of Jesus Christ in Christian Fellowship voted it in as canon.

== James J. Strang ==
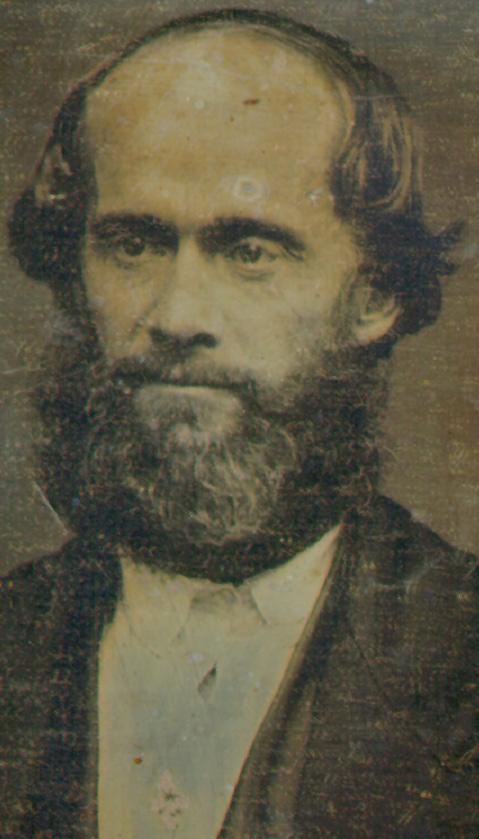
1856 daguerreotype of James Strang, taken on Beaver Island, Lake Michigan, by J. Atkyn, itinerant photographer and later one of Strang's assassins.

James J. Strang was a lawyer and newspaper editor from New York who converted to the Church of Jesus Christ of Latter Day Saints in 1844. Shortly after his baptism, Joseph Smith, founder of the Latter Day Saint movement, was murdered by a mob. Strang was one of three individuals who claimed the leadership role after Smith's death, but as a recent convert he did not possess the name recognition among rank-and-file Mormons held by his rivals Brigham Young and Sidney Rigdon. Hence, he faced an uphill battle in his quest to be recognized as the heir to Smith's prophetic mantle.

To advance his cause, Strang asserted that unlike Rigdon and Young, he had hard evidence of his prophetic calling. In September 1845, he announced the discovery of the Voree Record. This was presented as the final testament of Rajah Manchou of Vorito, an ancient inhabitant of the area, engraved on three brass plates that Strang dug up near Voree, Wisconsin. However, Strang's claims to possession of divinely-revealed ancient records, and the ability to correctly translate them, did not end there. In 1851, he proclaimed the publication of the Book of the Law of the Lord, a far more substantial work.

== Alleged provenance of the book ==
Strang explained that the Book of the Law, as it is often called, was "kept in the Ark of the Covenant, and was held too sacred to go into the hands of strangers." However, "when the Septuagint translation was made, the Book of the Law was kept back, and ... lost to the Jewish nation in the time that they were subject to foreign powers." Thus, "the various books in the Pentateuch, containing abstracts of some of the laws, have been read instead of it, until even the existence of the book has come to be a matter of doubt." While it is not stated directly, this implies that this book is the original Torah.

Strang did not claim that his 1851 edition was the complete Book of the Law mentioned in the Hebrew scriptures, but rather that it contained only selections that were pertinent for running the church and kingdom in the modern era. His 1856 expanded edition contains the same translation as the 1851 edition, but with added essays written by Strang and several modern revelations. Strangites also identify the Book of the Law with the "Stick of Judah" mentioned in Ezekiel 37:19. While other Latter Day Saint sects generally view the "Stick of Judah" as the Canonical Bible, Strangites assert that it refers primarily to this lost book.

== Witnesses ==
Seven witnesses testified to having seen and handled the plates that Strang claimed to possess. They described them as being eighteen in number, each measuring approximately seven and three-eighths inches wide, by nine inches long. Their brazen surfaces were "occasionally embellished with beautiful pictures," and all appeared to be of "beautiful antique workmanship, bearing a striking resemblance to the ancient oriental languages."

The witnesses of the plates were: Samuel Graham, Samuel P. Bacon, Warren Post, Phineas Wright, Albert N. Hosmer, Ebenezer Page, and Jehiel Savage. Wright and Post served as apostles in Strang's church. Post wrote in his journal that the plates weighed approximately six pounds. Although some of these witnesses later left Strang's church, none of them is known to have ever denied their testimony as given in the Book of the Law.

== Allegations of witness denials ==
Opponents from other Latter Day Saint churches have sought to cast doubt on the Strangite witness testimonies by claiming to have heard the witnesses deny their testimonies, though the evidence for these supposed denials was in many cases recorded decades after the fact. Such hearsay testimonies were commonly asserted in attempts to discredit the leaders of rival churches.

LDS Church apologist Daniel C. Peterson claims, without citing a source, that Samuel Graham admitted to helping Strang fabricate the plates.

In addition, Chauncy Loomis, in an 1888 letter to Joseph Smith III, claimed Samuel Bacon discovered "fragments of those plates which Strang made the Book of the Law from" hidden in the ceiling of Strang's house, supposedly prompting Bacon to immediately abandon the Strangite church and move away from Beaver Island. This information was released in The Saints' Herald, where it stated, "Bro. Samuel Bacon says that in repairing Strang's house he found hid behind the ceiling the fragments of those plates which Strang made the book of the Law from. He turned infidel and left the island." However, there are no contemporary documents such as diaries or letters to support this claim, nor any corroborating witnesses. Loomis did not tell anyone for over 30 years, casting further doubt on the story. Additionally, when Strang died, the Mormons' enemies from nearby Mackinac forced the Saints to leave Beaver Island and moved into their houses, and no one ever reported finding plate fragments during subsequent renovations.

In 1855, a Strangite Council removed Samuel Bacon from his office in the church. "Warren Post, who presented the resolution, later wrote that Bacon had 'denied the work being done was of the inspiration of God,' and had called it 'human intervention.'" This account came from a believing Strangite.

Strang claimed to have returned the brass plates to the angel after completing the translation in 1851, much like his predecessor did with the gold plates. No plates or plate fragments from them have ever been found.

== Editions of 1851 and 1856 ==
The Book of the Law of the Lord was published in two separate editions during Strang's lifetime. The first edition of 1851 contained only eighty pages and consisted of material translated directly from the Plates of Laban, with five exceptions: three revelations given to Strang, and two sections written "by inspiration of God."

In contrast, the edition of 1856 comprised 320 pages. It included all of the text in the 1851 edition, plus ten new chapters and a series of notes added by Strang to explain the text. The 1856 edition is the one generally used by Strangites today. It was never bound with a title page or preface; subsequent reprints have used the title page, testimony and preface from the 1851 edition. In fact, the 1856 edition was not bound at all until after Strang's death, as he was assassinated before this was completed. Its uncut sheets had to be rescued from an anti-Mormon mob by Strang's disciples.

Both editions of the Book of the Law are dated according to the year of Strang's reign, he having been crowned "king" of his church on Beaver Island in 1850. Hence the 1851 edition is annotated "A. R. I," while the 1856 edition carries the date "A. R. VI."

== Monarchy and priesthood ==
The most distinctive element of the Book of the Law is its overtly monarchical tone. Also of interest are the singular subdivisions Strang makes within the Melchizedek priesthood, which his book refers to as "The Priesthood of an endless life," and the Aaronic priesthood, referred to as "the Priesthood of life."

In the Melchizedek priesthood, Strang enumerates two "orders," that of "apostles," and that of "priests."

- "Apostles" are subdivided into four "degrees:"
  - The Prophet/President of the Strangite church is openly referred to throughout the book as a "King," rather than as a "President" (as under Joseph Smith).
  - His Counselors are designated as "Viceroys." The viceroys are also referred to as "kings," though this does not indicate a share in the unique royal dignity accorded to the President/King.
  - Strang's Twelve Apostles are named as "Princes in his Kingdom forever." The leader of Strang's Apostles is designated as "Prince and Grand Master of the Seventies."
  - A quorum of "Evangelists" is established, to be Apostles to a single "nation, kindred, tongue or people"—unlike the Twelve, who were sent to all nations. Seven Evangelists formed a quorum, and Strang noted that such a body had never been organized "in this dispensation." This priesthood office was unique to the Strangite organization, and does not correspond in any way to the office of evangelist or patriarch found in some other Latter Day Saint churches.
- "Priests" are subdivided into two "degrees:"
  - High Priests were to include "all inferiour Kings, Patriarchs, or heads of tribes, and Nobles, or heads of clans." Furthermore, Strang continued, "They who hold it are called Sons of God." From this group, said the Book of the Law, the king was to select "counsellors, judges and rulers."
  - The "degree" of Elders included both the offices of Seventy and Elder as generally constituted in Joseph Smith's church.

In the Aaronic priesthood, Strang enumerates three "orders:"

- Priests were to teach, preach and baptize, but not (as set out in the Doctrine and Covenants) to bless the sacrament; that was reserved to the High Priests of the Melchizedek Priesthood. They were subdivided into two "courses," one of which (the Singers) was opened to women:
  - "Sacrificators," who were to kill sacrifices in accordance with appropriate provisions of the Book of the Law [see below under "Animal sacrifice"], and
  - "Singers," who were to sing during the various services to be held in Strangite temples (no such temple was ever constructed by the Strangites, nor were its services ever apparently composed).
- Teachers were not merely to instruct in spiritual matters, but secular ones as well; they were to staff schools throughout Strang's kingdom. This office, like the office of Priest (Singer) was opened to women, and was subdivided into five degrees:
  - Rabboni,
  - Rabbi,
  - Doctor,
  - Ruler, and
  - Teacher.
- Deacons were to serve as "Stewards and keepers of the King’s prisons, and Stewards of the King’s Courts." They were subdivided into three "degrees:"
  - Marshals,
  - Stewards, and
  - Ministers.

In addition, a "King's Council" and a "King's Court" were established. While no direct link is made between the King's Court and the "High Council" established in the Doctrine and Covenants, certain parallels exist, such as requiring all members to hold the High Priesthood, and limiting their number to twelve.

Although Strang briefly enjoyed the services of apostle William Smith as "Chief Patriarch" of his church, he makes no mention of this office anywhere in his book.

== The Decalogue ==
Another unique feature of the Book of the Law is its version of the Decalogue, the "Ten Commandments" given to Moses on Sinai. Strang's rendering is different from any other Jewish, Catholic, Eastern Orthodox, Islamic or Protestant version, for it offers a commandment none of the others has: "Thou shalt love thy neighbor as thyself." In his "Note on the Decalogue," Strang asserted that no other version of the Decalogue contains more than nine commandments, and speculates that his fourth commandment was lost perhaps as early as Josephus's time (circa AD 37–100).

The Strangite Ten Commandments as found in the Book of the Law are as follows.

1. Thou shalt love the Lord thy God with all thy heart, and with all thy might, and with all thy strength.
2. Thou shalt not take the name of the Lord thy God in vain.
3. Remember the Sabbath day, to keep it holy. Six days shalt thou labour, and do all thy work, but the seventh day is the Sabbath of the Lord thy God: in it thou shalt not do any work; thou, nor thy son, nor thy daughter, nor thy manservant, nor thy womanservant, nor thy cattle, nor the stranger that is within thy gates.
4. Thou shalt love thy neighbor as thyself.
5. Honour thy father and thy mother.
6. Thou shalt not kill.
7. Thou shalt not commit adultery.
8. Thou shalt not steal.
9. Thou shalt not bear false witness.
10. Thou shalt not covet thy neighbour's inheritance.

== Ordination of women ==
As noted above, the Book of the Law opened two priesthood offices to women: Priest and Teacher. While only the "course" of "Singer" in the office of Priest was open to females, all five "degrees" in the office of Teacher were available. Furthermore, they could serve as "leaders" of the Singers. Strang ordained women to these ministries as early as 1851, and permitted them to lecture in his School of the Prophets by 1856. In contrast, no other major Latter Day Saint faction opened their priesthood to women until the Community of Christ did so in 1984. Women are still barred from the LDS Church priesthood today.

== Animal sacrifice ==
Animal sacrifice was instituted in the Book of the Law, both for forgiveness of sins and as a part of Strangite celebration rituals. However, given the prohibition on sacrifices for sin contained in 3 Nephi 9:19–20, Strang did not require sin offerings. Rather, he focused on sacrifice as an element of religious celebration, especially the commemoration of his own coronation as king (July 8, 1850). The head of every house, from the king to his lowest subject, was to offer "a heifer, or a lamb, or a dove. Every man a clean beast, or a clean fowl, according to his household."

The killing of sacrifices was a prerogative of Strangite Priests, but female Priests were specifically barred from participating in this aspect of the priestly office.

"Firstfruits" offerings were also demanded of all Strangite agricultural harvests. Animal sacrifices are no longer practiced by the Strangites, though belief in their correctness is still required.

== Monotheism and the vocation of Jesus Christ ==
Some of the teachings in the Book of the Law differed substantially from those held by other Mormon sects. For instance, in his "Note on the Sacrifice of Christ" and "The True God," Strang rejected both the traditional Christian doctrine of the virgin birth of Jesus and the Mormon doctrine of the Godhead. He insisted that there was but one eternal God, the Father, and that progression to godhood, a doctrine taught by Joseph Smith in the King Follett sermon, was impossible. God had always been God, said Strang, and He was one person (not three, as in the traditional Christian Trinity).

Jesus Christ, said Strang, was the natural-born son of Mary and Joseph, who was chosen from before all time to be the Savior of mankind, but who had to be born as an ordinary mortal of two human parents (rather than being begotten by the Father or the Holy Spirit) to be able to truly fulfill his Messianic role. Strang claimed that the earthly Christ was in essence "adopted" as God's son at birth, and fully revealed as such during the Transfiguration. After proving himself to God by living a perfectly sinless life, he was enabled to provide an acceptable sacrifice for the sins of men, prior to his resurrection and ascension.

Strang denied that God could do all things, and insisted that some things were as impossible for Him as for us. Thus, he saw no essential conflict between science and religion, and while he never openly championed evolution, he did state that God was limited in His power by both the matter He was working with and by the eons of time required to "organize" and shape it. Strang spoke glowingly of a future generation who would "make religion a science", to be "studied by as exact rules as mathematicks". "The mouth of the Seer will be opened", Strang prophesied, "and the whole earth enlightened."

Musing at length on the nature of sin and evil, Strang wrote that of all things that God could give to man, He could never give him experience. Thus, if free will were to be real, said Strang, humanity must be given the opportunity to fail and to learn from its own mistakes. The ultimate goal for each human being was to willingly conform oneself to the revealed character of God in every respect, preferring good to evil not out of any fear of punishment or desire for reward, but rather "on account of the innate loveliness of undefiled goodness; of pure unalloyed holiness".

== Other distinctive teachings ==
The Book of the Law taught the seventh-day Sabbath, and commanded it in lieu of Sunday. It also accredits baptism for the dead, but on a much more limited scale than that currently practiced by the LDS Church. Baptisms for the dead are not performed by the Strangites today, although belief in the doctrine is still maintained.

Eternal marriage is taught in the Book of the Law, though it is not required to be performed in a temple. Strangite Priests, Elders, High Priests or Apostles may all perform this ceremony. Eternal marriages are still contracted in the Strangite church today.

Oaths are taken very seriously in the Book of the Law, and severe spiritual penalties are forewarned upon all who break their solemn word, once given.

The Book of the Law permits not only the blessing of others, but cursing, as well. Cursing is not to be done in anger, nor indiscriminately; rather, it is only to be "invoked on such as, on deliberate and candid thought, are found condemned to them by the Law of God; and then the curse should be invoked as in the presence of God, the searcher of hearts; conscious that whosoever curses in the bitterness of his ... corrupt heart, and not in the light of God’s truth, the curse will return upon him." "Maledictions" are also to be performed by Strangite leaders upon "hereticks, schismaticks, and those guilty of gross and abominable immoralities, and acts of great cruelty and wickedness." [sic] The Strangite practice of "maledictions" is comparable to the "anathemas" pronounced in the New Testament and by the Roman Catholic and Eastern Orthodox churches.

Conservation of forests and resources is mandated in the Book of the Law. Groves of trees were to be maintained upon each farm, and in each village and town. Farms and cities without trees were required to plant them, and also to establish parklands so that "the aged and the young may go there to rest and to play."

Strangites are prohibited by the Book of the Law from dressing ostentatiously. Various (today mostly obsolete) styles are banned, though allowance is made for those who are "sojourning among Gentiles" to "imitate, to some moderate extent, their foolish and ridiculous styles, to avoid impertinent observations."

The Book of the Law sanctions marriage only between persons who are not impotent, deformed, of reduced stature ("a dwarf"), or mentally handicapped. "The same means which will improve a breed of cattle," Strang wrote, "will improve a race of men."

== Polygamy ==
Plural marriage is sanctioned, though not expressly commanded, in the Book of the Law. The applicable text reads: "Thou shalt not take unto thee a multitude of wives disproportioned to thy inheritance, and thy substance: nor shalt thou take wives to vex those thou hast; neither shalt thou put away one to take another." Any wife already married to the prospective polygamist was given the right to express her opinion, and even to object, but not to veto the marriage. This passage seems to offer any aggrieved wife an appeal to the "Judges," but how this was to be carried out is not made clear. Women, on the other hand, were not permitted to marry multiple husbands.

Strang's defense of polygamy was rather novel. He claimed that, far from enslaving or demeaning women, it liberated and "elevated" them by allowing them to choose the best possible mate based upon any factors deemed important to them—even if that mate were already married to someone else. Rather than being forced to wed "corrupt and degraded sires" due to the scarcity of more suitable men, a woman could wed the one she saw as the most compatible to herself, the best candidate to father her children and the man who could give her the best possible life, even if he already had wives. Strangites did not approve of having more wives than a man could provide for, both monetarily and in time and affection, thus they disapproved of the practices of the LDS Church.

The practice of plural marriage has never been officially proscribed in the Strangite church, though no Strangites are known to be practicing it today. Only 22 men in Strang's church ever contracted plural marriages, with most of them taking only one additional wife. Strang took four additional wives, the most of any member.

Polygamy was practiced by a few Strangites up to the 1880s. Because United States federal and state laws prohibit the practice, Strangites have abandoned polygamy in favor of observing the divine injunction to obey "the law of the land". However, belief in plural marriage's correctness is still maintained.

Strangites reject the LDS Church's 1843 polygamy revelation, regarding it as a forgery from 1852 that was never received or approved by Joseph Smith.

== See also ==
- Reformed Egyptian
