= First Nephi =

First book in the Book of Mormon

The First Book of Nephi: His Reign and Ministry (/ˈniːfaɪ/), usually referred to as First Nephi or 1 Nephi, is the first book of the Book of Mormon, the sacred text of churches within the Latter Day Saint movement, and one of four books with the name Nephi. First Nephi tells the story of Nephi's family's escape from Jerusalem prior to the exile to Babylon, struggle to survive in the wilderness, and building a ship and sailing to the "promised land", commonly interpreted by Mormons as the Americas. The book is composed of two intermingled genres: one a historical narrative describing the events and conversations that occurred, and the other a recounting of visions, sermons, poetry, and doctrinal discourses as shared by either Nephi or his father Lehi to members of the family.

== Structure ==
First Nephi is a first-person narrative of events that the narrative itself reports were recorded on a set of objects referred to by Mormons as the Plates of Nephi by the prophet Nephi. The beginning part of First Nephi consists of Nephi's abridgement of his father Lehi's record (1 Nephi 1–9), while the next section is Nephi's own narrative of events (1 Nephi 10–22). The Second Book of Nephi is a continuation of the First Book of Nephi.

== Narrative ==
Summary	Chapters
Lehi's vision of Jerusalem's destruction; fleeing Jerusalem	1–2
Return for the plates	3–5
Second return for Ishmael's family	6–7
Lehi's Vision	8–9
Nephi's Vision of Israel's history	10–14
Nephi's explanation of Lehi's vision to his brothers	15
Traveling the desert and building the ship	16–18
Nephi's explanation of the plates	20–22

=== Fleeing Jerusalem ===
Beginning in Jerusalem at the time of King Zedekiah's reign, Nephi's father, Lehi, has a vision and is warned of the imminent Babylonian destruction of Jerusalem. Lehi attempts to share this warning with the people of Jerusalem, but they dismiss his warning and try to kill him. Lehi and his family (wife Sariah, four sons Laman, Lemuel, Sam and Nephi, and unnamed daughters) leave Jerusalem and establish a camp in the wilderness.

=== Killing Laban and returning for Ishmael's family ===
Lehi sends his sons back to Jerusalem to retrieve some brass plates, a record in the possession of Laban, a leader in Jerusalem and relative of Lehi. Nephi and his brothers make two failed attempts after which Nephi tries a third time by himself only to find Laban drunk and unconscious. Prompted by the Holy Spirit, Nephi kills Laban with his own sword and dresses in Laban's clothes. Impersonating Laban, Nephi commands Laban's servant, Zoram, to bring the brass plates outside the city to his brothers. Zoram discovers Nephi's subterfuge and tries to flee, but Nephi persuades him to travel with his family, and they all return with the plates. The brass plates indicate that Lehi is a descendant of Joseph, the son of Jacob. The plates also contain the five books of Moses, the writings of Isaiah and other prophets. Lehi's sons return to Jerusalem once more to retrieve the family of Ishmael, some of whom later become spouses for Lehi's children.

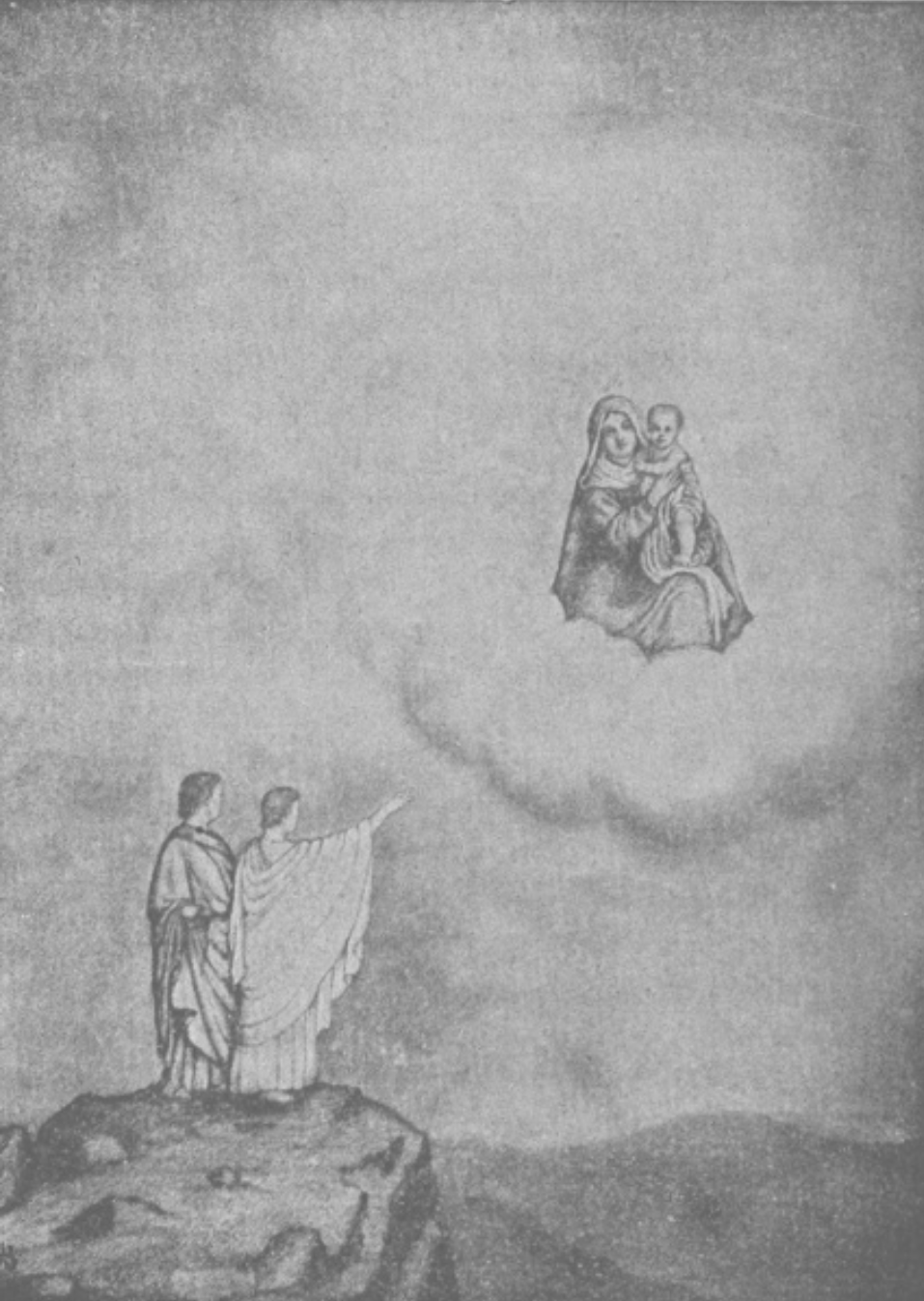
The vision of Nephi

=== Visions of Lehi and Nephi ===
Lehi has a vision of the tree of life, which includes a revelation that a Messiah would visit the earth within 600 years. In the vision, Lehi sees a tree next to a river and eats its fruit, which makes him joyful. Wishing to share the fruit with his family, he sees his wife, Sariah, and two sons, Nephi and Sam, who come and eat with him. His two oldest sons, Laman and Lemuel, stay near the river and do not eat the fruit. Then Lehi sees an iron rod and a "strait and narrow path" which leads to the tree. People try to get to the tree, but are lost in the "mist of darkness". Some get to the tree by holding on to the rod, but they are ashamed when they eat the fruit. Across the river, a "great and spacious building" is full of people who are making fun of those who ate the fruit, and subsequently, the fruit-eaters become lost.

Nephi prays to the Lord for a similar vision and for help understanding his father's vision. Nephi then has a vision that matches the one his father had. He is told an explanation of its symbolism. Additionally, Nephi is shown past and future events, including the life of the Son of God and his appearances in both the New and the Old World. He also sees, according to a Pentecostal interpretation, "the arrival of Europeans in the Americas, the troubles faced by latter-day Christianity, the coming forth of the Book of Mormon, and the final gathering of Israel". After Nephi's vision, Laman and Lemuel argue over the meaning of Lehi's vision. Nephi chastises them for not asking the Lord for interpretation, and explains the point of disputation. He pleads with them to pray and repent.

=== Traveling the desert and building the ship ===
After Lehi's sons marry Ishmael's daughters, Lehi discovers a "ball of curious workmanship" (a compass) at his tent door which they call a Liahona. Follow the Liahona's direction, they journey in the wilderness. As they travel, Nephi's steel bow breaks while hunting. Upon hearing the news, members of the camp complain and "murmur against the Lord" for their misfortune, including Lehi. Lehi repents and gives Nephi the Lord's direction for fertile hunting ground. Ishmael dies on their journey. His daughters, in mourning, respond by complaining. Laman and Lemuel conspire to kill Lehi and Nephi, but the voice of the Lord chastises them, and they repent.

After eight years of wandering, they arrive at a coast and the voice of the Lord commands Nephi to build a ship. As he begins, Laman and Lemuel mock him for attempting an impossible task. Nephi recounts the Israelite's exodus and colonization of Canaan to Laman and Lemuel, and touches them with a divine shock as a sign of God's power. They complete the ship, and depart on the ocean. Laman and Lemuel continue to persecute Nephi. Many days later, they arrive in the promised land, where they settle.

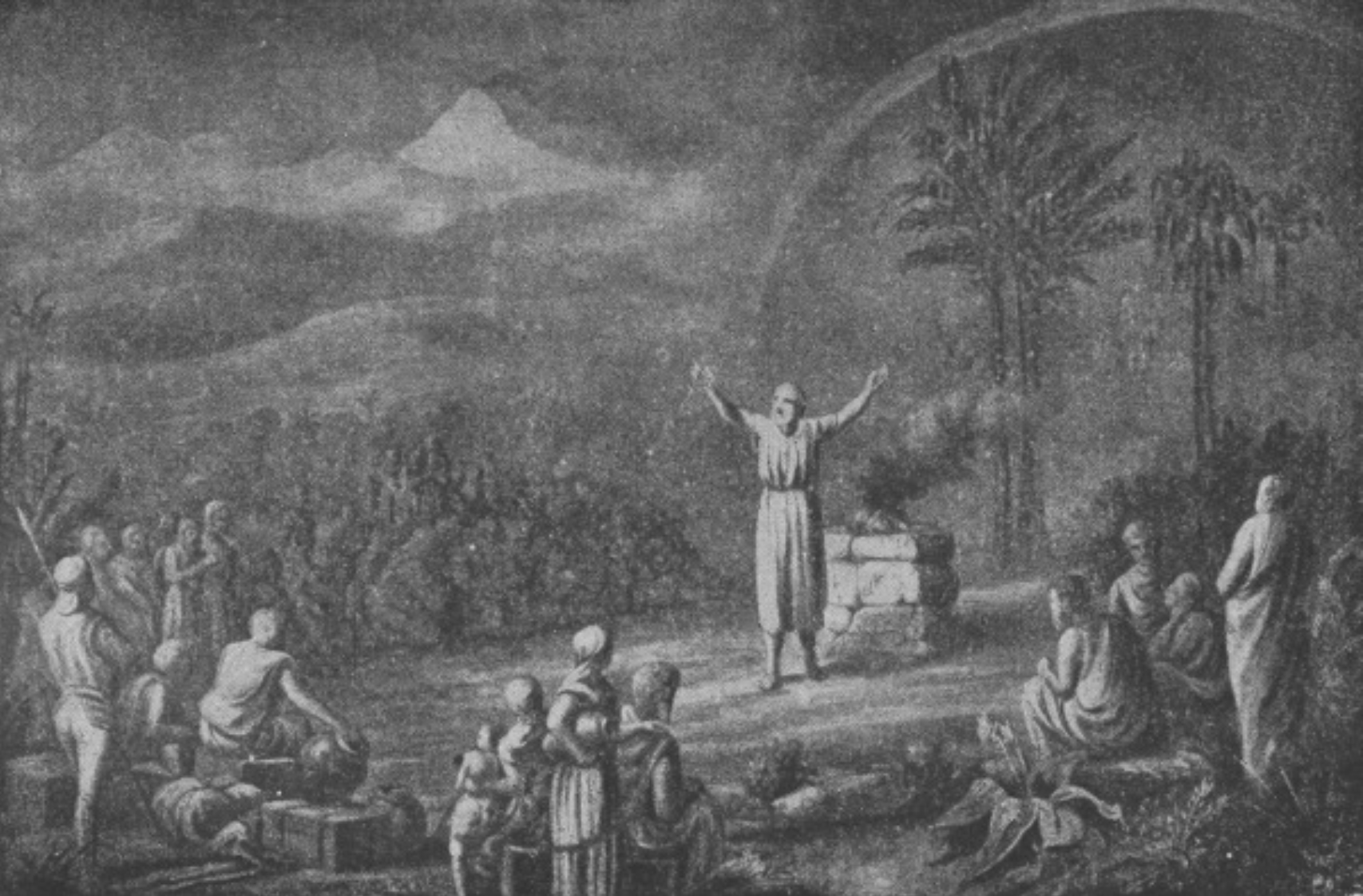
Artistic depiction of the first sacrifice in the promised land

=== Nephi's explanation of the plates ===
Nephi writes about God's command that he chronicle the events of his people, their genealogy, and the gospel. In dialogue with his brothers, he quotes prophecies of Christ and quotes Isaiah 48–49. He interprets his quotations from Zenos (who is not found in the Bible) and the Biblical prophet Isaiah, saying that all the ancient prophets testified of the savior, and only through him can they be redeemed for their sins. He writes that God's covenants with Israel will eventually be restored, including to the descendants of his father Lehi.

== Interpretation and themes ==
=== Exodus ===
Multiple scholars have noticed parallels between Nephi's journey in first Nephi and the Exodus story in the Bible. Nephi consciously encourages Laman and Lemuel to compare their situation to Moses's. He compares their situation to that of Moses after failing to get the plates from Laban in 1 Nephi 4:2–3. When a miracle provides them with food, Nephi writes that it was like when the Israelites were fed with manna (1 Nephi 17:28). He compares their being led by God to when the Israelites were led by a light at night (1 Nephi 17:13, 30). In one of the first examinations of the Exodus type in the Book of Mormon, George S. Tate, a professor of comparative literature at Brigham Young University, argues that Nephi uses parallels to Moses' Exodus as a rhetorical technique to encourage and unify his people. Nephi's use of the Exodus type sets up other Exodus patterns in the Book of Mormon, which is also a pattern of personal conversion. S. Kent Brown, a professor of ancient scripture at Brigham Young University, states that Nephi uses the Exodus type to prove God's power, and by extension, his own prophetic power. Nephi writes that God gave power to Moses to part the Red Sea, so he could give Nephi a similar power to know "the judgements that shall come" (1 Nephi 8:12). Brant Gardner, an LDS scholar of Mesoamerican ethnohistory with previous publications in FARMS, wrote in his commentary on the Book of Mormon that Nephi likely wrote first Nephi to fit the pattern of Exodus in the Old Testament, as a way to create a foundational narrative for his people. In his book The Testimony of Two Nations published with the University of Illinois Press, Michael Austin examines 1 Nephi 17:33–35, in which Nephi refutes the logic of the Deuteronomists and Laman and Lemuel, who believe that the Exodus story proves God loves His chosen people more than other people. Nephi says that the Exodus story proves that God "esteemeth all flesh in one" and favors those who keep his commandments.

=== The Great and Abominable Church ===
Nephi sees the persecution of the apostles and their followers by the "house of Israel", then later sees a "great church" that is, according to the description of the angel, "...most abominable above all other churches, which slayeth the saints of God, yea, and tortureth them and bindeth them down, and yoketh them with a yoke of iron...".

The LDS teaching of a Great Apostasy implies that the Catholic church is no longer true. Early LDS authority figures believed that the "great and abominable church" described the Catholic church. LDS general authority Bruce R. McConkie famously identified the "great and abominable church" as the Catholic church in his book Mormon Doctrine (1958). After its publication, church leaders at the time recognized McConkie’s problematic claims and pushed for discontinuation of the book. When a second edition came out, many of McConkie’s opinions of Catholicism were moderated. Official LDS publications discourage the identification of the great and abominable church with the Catholic Church, as well as with any other specific religion, denomination or organization. According to a 1988 article by Stephen E. Robinson in Ensign, an official magazine of LDS Church, "no single known historical church, denomination, or set of believers meets all the requirements for the great and abominable church... Rather, the role of Babylon has been played by many different agencies, ideologies, and churches in many different times."

=== Killing Laban ===
Many scholars have commented on the theological implications of Nephi reporting that the Holy Ghost told him to slay Laban. Latter-day Saint critic Eugene England analyzed Laban as a scapegoat figure common in ancient times, but saw this as a flawed argument. For BYU religion professor Charles Swift, Nephi acted out of necessity; but acknowledges that there were many other ways God could have provided the brass plates to Nephi. Jeffrey R. Holland and Swift argue that Nephi had to slay Laban in order to obey God, and that is the most important thing.

=== Women ===
In First Nephi, the only named woman in the narrative is Nephi's mother, Sariah. Ishmael's wife and daughters are not given names. The existence of Nephi's sisters is not mentioned until 2 Nephi. Nephi refers to Ishmael's daughters as Ishmael's daughters or the wives/women of him and his brothers, showing that their social relation to other men is what gives them importance for Nephi. Similarly, Sariah is always referred to as a mother or wife, not as an individual. The two scenes of female resistance – Sariah worrying that her sons have not returned because they have died and Ishmael's daughters wishing to return to Jerusalem after their father's death – create a type scene with instructive differences between the two. For Spencer, the latter story illustrates how treatment of women has changed after the "Nephite-Lamanite" divide. In Sariah's story, she reconciles with Lehi after she sees that the Lord protected her sons. In contrast, no one attempts to comfort the daughters of Ishmael and instead, Laman and Lemuel conspire with the sons of Ishmael to kill Lehi and Nephi, silencing the women and using their discontent for their own designs.

== Significant textual variants ==
The original translation of the book's title did not include the word "first". First and Second were added to the titles of the Books of Nephi by Oliver Cowdery when preparing the book for printing.

Originally, Joseph Smith indicated seven chapter breaks in First Nephi:

Chapter organization in 1 Nephi
in Joseph's manuscript	in current LDS edition (since 1879)
Chapter I	1 Nephi 1–5
Chapter II	1 Nephi 6–9
Chapter III	1 Nephi 10–14
Chapter IV	1 Nephi 15
Chapter V	1 Nephi 16:1–19:21
Chapter VI	1 Nephi 19:22–21:26
Chapter VII	1 Nephi 22

Editions of the Book of Mormon from the Community of Christ still use the original chapter organization. In 1879, Orson Pratt reformatted the LDS edition to include twenty-two thematically-arranged chapters.

Textual variations in 1 Nephi concern the nature of God. In the first edition of the Book of Mormon, 1 Nephi 11:21 reads "behold the Lamb of God yea even the Eternal Father". Joseph Smith inserted "the Son of" in this verse and three others in 1 Nephi. According to Skousen, this was simply to clarify that these verses referred to the Son of God, since other references to Christ as the Father are left as is. Joseph Spencer, examining the same passage, writes that the reason for clarifying these passages is unclear, but notes that 1 Nephi 12:18 clearly delineates the three separate members of the Godhead. In that verse, God the Father is referred to as "the Eternal Father."

== See also ==
- The Book of Mormon Movie, Vol. 1: The Journey

== Sources ==
- Austin, Michael (2024). The Testimony of Two Nations: How the Book of Mormon Reads, and Rereads, the Bible. University of Illinois Press. ISBN 978-0-252-08747-9. Wikidata Q123671090.
- Gardner, Brant (2007). Second Witness. Volume 1 First Nephi. Vol. 1. Greg Kofford Books. ISBN 978-1-58958-041-1. Wikidata Q123118187.
- Hardy, Grant, ed. (2023). The Annotated Book of Mormon. Oxford University Press. ISBN 978-0-19-008220-8. OL 46783409M. Wikidata Q122259222.
- Salleh, Fatimah; Hemming, Margaret (2020). The Book of Mormon for the Least of These Vol. 1. Vol. 1. By Common Consent Press. ISBN 978-1-948218-23-8. Wikidata Q123378840.
- Skousen, Royal Jon (2004), Analysis of Textual Variants of the Book of Mormon. Volume 1 1 Nephi 1 - 2 Nephi 10, vol. 1, Wikidata Q123273058
- Spencer, Joseph M. (2020). 1st Nephi. Brief Theological Introductions. Maxwell Institute. ISBN 978-0-8425-0007-4. Wikidata Q123273199.
- Swift, Charles (2005). "Lehi's Vision of the Tree of Life: Understanding the Dream as Visionary Literature". Journal of Book of Mormon Studies. 14 (2): 60. doi:10.5406/jbookmormstud.14.2.0052.
- Thomas, John Christopher (2016). A Pentecostal Reads the Book of Mormon: A Literary and Theological Introduction. CPT Press. ISBN 978-1-935931-55-3. Wikidata Q123196681.

First Nephi Small Plates of Nephi
Preceded by None	Book of Mormon	Succeeded by Second Nephi
