= World government (Mormonism) =

In the mid 19th-century, under the direction of the prophet Joseph Smith and other prominent leaders such as Brigham Young, The Church of Jesus Christ of Latter-day Saints (LDS Church) taught that a world government would exist upon the earth during the end times. The world government would be known as the Kingdom of God on earth. It was taught that this Kingdom would rule over all the people of the earth and would allow each individual to live under true freedom and liberty.

On March 11, 1844, Smith organized an arm of the organization—the Council of Fifty—which was to work under the direction of the priesthood authority of the church. The Council of Fifty was organized "for the maintenance, promulgation and protection of civil and religious liberty." The council was intended to act in a legislative capacity as a Theodemocracy. The council's decisions could be vetoed by the church's priesthood authority. Another body, the Council of Friends, would also be formed. The Council of Friends was to be a three-member body which would function as the political Kingdom of God prior to the Second Coming of Jesus. The Second Coming would usher in the Millennium, a 1000-year period in which world political power would reside with this world government.

The political and spiritual kingdoms of God were to be distinct entities, with "a constitutional separation of powers between Zion New Jerusalem and the political government (Jerusalem of old)." The third leg of the government, the Council of Friends, would act as advisors to both the Council of Fifty, and the priesthood body of the church. All three bodies were to be composed of righteous men.

The Melchizedek priesthood authority would yield veto power over the Council of Fifty, with ultimate power held by a single anointed individual. Smith was ordained "King" on April 11, 1844, and was thereby set to preside over the political kingdom of God. Smith was killed just over two months later, on June 27, 1844.

Smith taught that New Jerusalem would be a seat of the Kingdom of God on the earth. The founding of this millennial Zion was so important for early church members that thousands of converts from many different countries sacrificed all they had to aid in the realization Smith's vision. Smith taught that the New Jerusalem would be located in Jackson County, Missouri.

In the LDS Church today, there is little knowledge of these principles and they are not emphasized. However, Mormon fundamentalist groups still actively pursue and promote these principles.
