= Laban (Book of Mormon) =

Person in the Book of Mormon

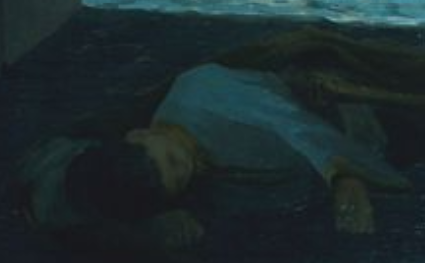
- Laban unconscious (1 Nephi 4:7), as depicted in H. H. Haag's 1894 Nephi and Laban

Personal life
- Died: Jerusalem
- Cause of death: Killed by Nephi
- Era: Reign of Zedekiah
- Known for: Possessing the brass plates

Laban (/ˈleɪbən/) is a figure in the First Book of Nephi, near the start of the Book of Mormon, a scripture of the Latter Day Saint movement. Although he only makes a brief appearance in the Book of Mormon, his brass plates play an important role when they are taken by Laman and Nephi (often referred to as the "sons of Lehi") and are used by the Nephites.

== Narrative ==
Laban appears in First Nephi as a wealthy and politically influential military commander who may be a distant kinsman of Lehi. Laban owns brass plates which are held in high esteem. Lehi sends his sons Laman and Nephi to retrieve these plates, but Laban rebuffs them. He then attempts to kill the brothers two times, and the second time he steals the Lehi family fortune. Later, Nephi sneaks into Jerusalem and discovers Laban lying drunk in the road. Directed by the Spirit of the Lord, Nephi decapitates Laban. He then puts on Laban's clothing and armor and retrieves the plates.

== Interpretations ==
=== Brass Plates ===
Brant Gardner identified five ways that the brass plates of Laban were "extremely important", both in the immediate context of their retrieval by the sons of Lehi and in later Nephite, Lamanite, and Mulekite society. For Gardner, the plates function as a symbol of political authority, as a "social anchor" for the Nephites, a doctrinal source text, a prototype for Nephite recordkeeping, and as a "sacred object". The last point, indicating that the brass plates function as royal insignia, is also discussed in depth by Stephen D. Ricks, a Latter-day Saint Hebraist and apologist. Ricks associated the brass plates with the "protocol" that was used as a prop in Josiah's coronation, citing Rashi's interpretation of the Hebrew word edût as the Torah in 2 Kings 11:12.

James Strang, like Joseph Smith, claimed to translate scripture from metal plates. The resulting scripture, the Book of the Law of the Lord, claims to contain at least part of Laban's plates.

=== Death ===
Nephi's killing of Laban has been argued over by believers and others engaging with the narrative on its own terms. Some say that the killing was legally justified as self defense, that it was a political act, that it was specifically one of "sovereignty", and that it functioned similarly to the biblical Akedah as a test of Nephi's faith. Commentators have suggested that the story was a way for Joseph Smith to deal with repressed childhood trauma and symbolically sever of the Book of Mormon narrative from the established biblical canon as the Spirit of the Lord ordered Laban's murder. Steven L. Peck, a Latter-day Saint novelist wrote a Deleuzean treatment of the sword of Laban as emblematic of climate change and of power structures, referring to it as symptomatic of the "Jerusalem-machine".

== Popular culture ==
In The Book of Mormon Movie, adapted from First and Second Nephi, Laban was portrayed by the actor Michael Flynn. The film was widely panned by Latter-day Saint and secular critics. The Austin Chronicle wrote of "Michael Flynn turning in a ripping good Edward G. Robinson impersonation as the villainous Laban."

== See also ==
- Book of Mormon chronology
- List of plates (Latter Day Saint movement)

== Works cited ==
- Gardner, Brant (2007). Second Witness. Volume 1 First Nephi. Vol. 1. Greg Kofford Books. ISBN 978-1-58958-041-1. Wikidata Q123118187.
- Thomas, John Christopher (2016). A Pentecostal Reads the Book of Mormon: A Literary and Theological Introduction. CPT Press. ISBN 978-1-935931-55-3. Wikidata Q123196681.
