= Second Nephi =

Second book of the Book of Mormon

The Second Book of Nephi (/ˈniːfaɪ/), usually referred to as Second Nephi or 2 Nephi, is the second book of the Book of Mormon, the primary religious text of the Latter-day Saint Movement. Narrated by Nephi, son of Lehi, unlike the first Book of Nephi, 2 Nephi contains little history of the Nephite people and focuses predominately on visions and prophecies of Nephi himself and other prophets, particularly Isaiah.

The book begins with Lehi's blessings and final teachings to his family before his death. Lehi explores themes of cosmological dualism ("opposition"), the Fall of man, resurrection, and atonement. After Lehi's death the family splits into two factions: the Nephites, led by Nephi, and the Lamanites led by Nephi's older brother Laman. The Nephites are forced to flee their original settlement and the Lamanites are cursed by God with a "skin of blackness". The Nephites build a temple and follow the Law of Moses. Nephi and his younger brother Jacob preach, extensively quoting and analyzing the Book of Isaiah, often word-for-word from the King James Version of the Bible.

== Structure ==
Second Nephi was originally called the Book of Nephi and was divided into 33 chapters. Later, Oliver Cowdery added First and Second to the titles of the books of Nephi. In the first five chapters, which comprise the narrative section of the book, Nephi continues with the family meeting begun in the end of First Nephi. Much of the rest of Second Nephi includes quotations from Isaiah and further teachings from Nephi and his brother Jacob. Joseph Spencer explains that the simple structure of 2 Nephi is as follows: the division of Lehi’s descendants (chapters 1–5), teachings concerning reconciliation with God (chapters 6–30), and discussion on baptism (chapters 31–33).

Summary	Chapters
Lehi's farewell	1–4:12
Division of Nephites and Lamanites	4:13–5
Jacob teaches the Nephites	6–10
Nephi witnesses of Christ	11
Nephi quotes Isaiah	12–24
Nephi prophesies and elaborates	25–33

== Narration ==
=== Lehi's last counsel ===
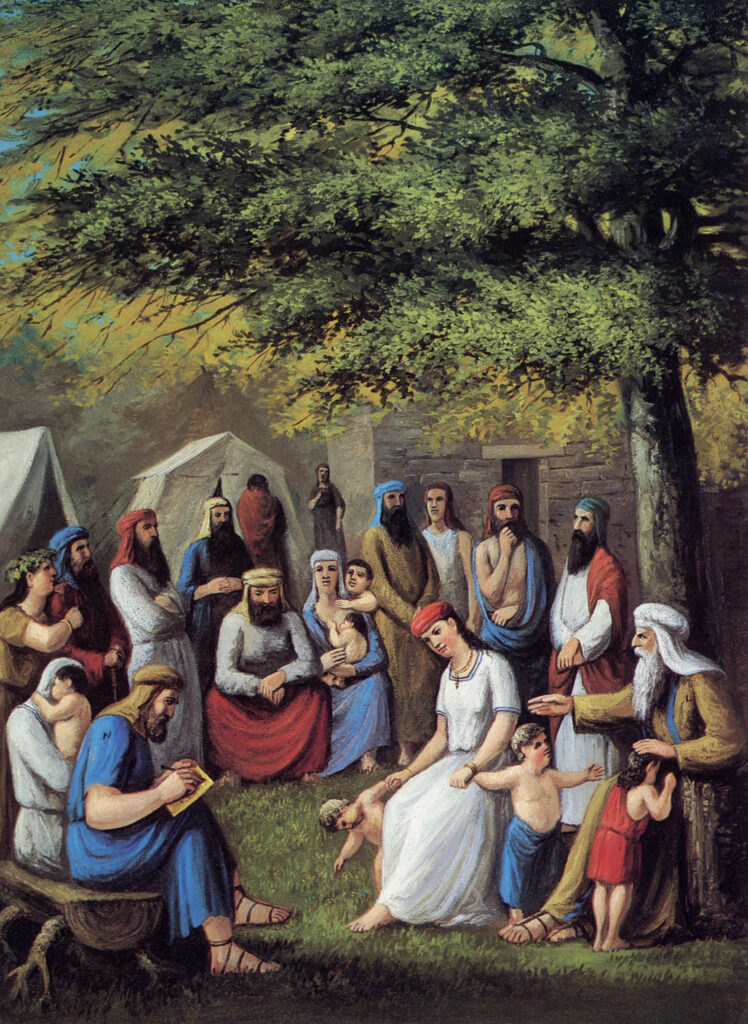
Lehi Blesses His Posterity by C. C. A. Christensen, 1890

Second Nephi begins with a reminder that Lehi had warned of Jerusalem's destruction and that his family had been purposefully led to safety. In the narrative, Lehi receives a vision confirming that Jerusalem has been destroyed; his family also learns the "promised land" they were led to is their inheritance as long as they follow God.

Lehi advises each of his sons to follow Nephi’s leadership, particularly Laman, Lemuel, and the sons of Ishmael. He then blesses Zoram, as a friend of Nephi, saying that his descendants will flourish if they are righteous. Lehi then blesses Jacob, promising that his suffering will be consecrated; he also speaks to him about the Atonement with a focus on opposition and how both good and bad things are important in life. He teaches all of his sons that the Fall of Man was necessary for humans to progress past their original innocent state and have children, emphasizing that all have their own right to choose for themselves. After blessing Jacob, Lehi speaks to Joseph. In his blessing, he says that Joseph's descendants will not be completely destroyed. Further, he cites a prophecy from Joseph of Egypt, which is contained in the brass plates and predicts that God will prepare a seer named Joseph. This seer, Lehi explains, has ancestral connections to both Joseph of Egypt and Joseph, son of Lehi, and will bring the knowledge of the covenant back to Lehi’s descendants. Lehi also reveals that Joseph of Egypt prophesied of Moses leading the Israelites out of Egypt. Lehi proceeds to bless Laman and Lemuel’s children so that their people will never become extinct. Afterward, he blesses Ishmael’s sons, Sam, and Sam’s family. Nephi does not describe any specific personal blessings he might have received at this time.

=== Division of the people ===
Lehi dies sometime after giving these blessings to his family and Nephi follows the account with his own words. In his psalm, Nephi records his struggles with sin and remembers some of the times God has saved him. Later, Laman, Lemuel, and Ishmael’s descendants are upset about Nephi being chosen as their leader and try to kill him. He prays about Laman and Lemuel’s murmuring and dissent and is told by God to take his family into the wilderness. In response, he takes the brass plates, the Liahona, and Laban’s sword, and leaves with Zoram, Sam, Jacob, Joseph, and his sisters. This group becomes the Nephites. They work and are obedient to the commandments and build a temple modeled after Solomon’s. Nephi chooses not to be king but continues to help his people. He makes swords based on the sword of Laban for protection in case the Lamanites attack. The Lamanites are cut off from God, cursed, and given a "skin of blackness" to make them "loathsome" to the Nephites unless they repent. Nephi consecrates Jacob and Joseph as priests and teachers, and the Nephites "live after the manner of happiness."

=== Jacob's sermon ===
In chapters 6–10, Jacob gives a two-day sermon that includes many words from Isaiah 49:22–52:2 in which he invites the people to compare Isaiah’s teachings to their own experiences. He preaches about "the Holy One of Israel", God’s plan, the consequences of sin, resurrection, judgment, deliverance from hell, and the righteous' inheritance of God’s kingdom. In his sermon, Jacob warns the prideful wealthy, those who think their intellect sets them above God’s teachings, and various others who ignore God; he states that in these conditions they cannot be saved. He then speaks of the Jews, Gentiles, and descendants of Lehi in the last days before Christ’s coming and explains that the Gentiles will be counted as part of the house of Israel. He also teaches that after Israel is scattered, descendants of the house of Israel who repent and believe will be subsequently restored to their lands. The land Lehi’s family has come to is a land of inheritance and is promised as a land of liberty. Jacob ends with the instruction to turn to God and choose eternal life.

=== Nephi quotes Isaiah, prophesies, and gives final counsel ===
Nephi too writes of likening the words of Isaiah to the Nephites and says that the purpose of the Mosaic covenant is to show that Christ will come. Nephi claims that his entire life and the purpose of his writings is to witness of Christ and be an example so people can receive the blessings of the covenant. Many of the next Isaiah quotations, found in chapters 12–24, focus on judgment, restoration, and the Messiah.

In chapters 25–33, Nephi himself prophesies, still including words from Isaiah. He continues with a focus on the Messiah and then turns to false churches of the future and people fighting against Zion, as well as the emergence of the Book of Mormon. He predicts that churches in the "last days" will be prideful and spread false teachings and warns churches against priestcraft, telling them not to keep the free blessings of the gospel away from anyone. Nephi explains that the "great and abominable" church will fall and as such records many warnings against sin and its consequences. Nephi also predicts that the Jews, Nephites, and the lost Israelites will eventually receive and have access to each others’ writings. He prophesies of the return of the Gospel to Lehi’s descendants and speaks again on restoration. He says that to be saved, one must repent, be baptized in the name of Christ, receive the Holy Ghost, and endure to the end. He explains again the importance of the words of Christ and ends by inviting the reader to pray in order to believe in Christ and know that his words are true.

== Interpretation ==
=== Break between First and Second Nephi ===
Different theories have emerged as to why Nephi's two books seem to break in the middle of a family event. Frederick Axelgard, Latter-day Saint and Senior Fellow at the Wheatley Institute, suggests the account would be better divided at 2 Nephi 5, which generally marks the end of Nephi's historical narrative. Political science professor and apologist Noel B. Reynolds writes that the first five chapters of Second Nephi seem to be establishing Nephi's authority and leadership qualifications.

Alternatively, literary scholar Terryl Givens proposes the interruption of the timeline was purposeful to emphasize an important theme of covenants in the Book of Mormon. Lehi's vision confirms Jerusalem and its temple have been destroyed, says Givens, and triggers subsequent explanations to show the family they are still a covenant people to God and that the Israelites will not be lost forever. These are ideas that Givens connects to Moroni's introductory thematic statement on the purpose of the Book of Mormon. He also suggests that Lehi's blessings to his children and many of the Isaiah quotations are aimed at this same purpose and show the family they are part of the covenant as long as they do not reject the Messiah.

=== Dark skin of the Lamanites a curse ===
2 Nephi 5:21 describes the Lamanites as being cursed and marked with a "skin of blackness" because of their unbelief in order to make them less attractive to the Nephites. In 2 Nephi 30:6, the Lamanites are promised to become "pure and delightsome" (a passage that was "white and delightsome" before 1981). In a book about Mormon conceptions of race, sociologist Armand Mauss writes that modern secular readers see these passages as referring to race, and interpret them as reflecting the 19th-century racism of the day. Mauss argues that "white" was "almost always" a synonym for pure and clean in the Book of Mormon's original text, but acknowledges that these verses informed the prevailing image of Lamanites as savage Indians who ought to be assimilated among mid-19th-century Latter-day Saints. Mauss calls for a nonracist interpretation of the verses in 2 Nephi. Since the Nephites and Lamanites are both descended from Lehi, he argues, their main differences are cultural, not racial. 2 Nephi 26:33 states that "all are alike unto God", specifically referring to "black and white, bond and free". Mauss interprets it as a "repudiation of racism in divine affairs". In another book on race and the early LDS Church, Max Mueller writes that this purported universalist idea is "rooted in the limitations of whiteness as a universal racial category, a reality of which the Book of Mormon itself seems to be aware." In his Annotated Book of Mormon, Grant Hardy writes that modern readers are justifiably distressed by the Lamanites being marked with a dark skin. Hardy writes that skin color does not prevent the Lamanites from exceeding Nephites in righteousness, and the curse comes with a promise that their lineage will be preserved, while the Nephites eventually die out.

=== Atonement in 2 Nephi ===
Lehi's discussion with Jacob in 2 Nephi 2 is doctrinally rich and frequently used in theological discussion of the atonement in Latter-day Saint thought. 2 Nephi 2 contains the first mention of "atone" in the Book of Mormon. Writing for Dialogue, Jacob Morgan cites two scriptures from 2 Nephi 2 to support his unorthodox argument that the atonement gave mankind the light of Christ, or a conscience, which prevents humans from choosing "eternal death" (verse 29). Having a conscience makes humans free to "act for themselves" (verse 26) and gives them agency. In his chapter on the atonement in the Book of Mormon, Nicholas J. Frederick, an associate professor of ancient scripture at Brigham Young University argues that ideas from multiple atonement theories are present in the Book of Mormon and gives two examples from 2 Nephi. He writes that 2 Nephi 2:6–10 can support the governmental theory of atonement, where Christ's atonement satisfied the demands of justice. This passage does not mention Christ's suffering in Gethsemane (wherein many Latter-day Saints believe the payment for sins occurred) but only his death and resurrection. Later, Jacob's sermon in 2 Nephi 9:7–12 seems to support a Christus Victor theory, where Christ's death was a ransom paid to Satan. Jacob describes how Christ's atonement was infinite in 2 Nephi 9:25–26, and allows God to show mercy. Frederick gives a caveat that these interpretations may require imposing too much of previous theories on the text.

=== The Fall in 2 Nephi ===
In 2 Nephi 2, Lehi's articulation of the fall of man reinterprets it as a necessary component of God's plans for human salvation. 2 Nephi 2:18 identifies "the serpent" as the devil.

According to literary critic Michael Austin, 2 Nephi describes prelapsarian reproduction as impossible, making the fall a prerequisite for procreation. According to biblical scholar Julie Smith, 2 Nephi 2 can alternatively be interpreted as meaning reproduction was impossible only during the time when Eve had eaten the fruit but Adam had not.

The discussion in 2 Nephi 2, specifically verse 25, which states that "Adam fell that men might be", is frequently used in LDS interpretation of the fall to see it as part of God's plan. Some LDS thinkers take the idea further and say that Eve's decision was "wise", a stance that Smith calls the "Wise Choice Theory". According to Smith, the "classic statement of the Wise Choice Theory" among Latter-day Saints is from a 1993 General Conference talk by apostle Dallin H. Oaks who stated that "we celebrate Eve's act and honor her wisdom and courage in the great episode called the Fall", and cited Brigham Young and Joseph Fielding Smith to aver that was formally a transgression of law but did not constitute sin. Most official Latter-day Saint discourse interprets Eve's role in the fall "overwhelmingly positive[ly]", religious studies scholar Susannia Morrill explains.

Smith argues that God's curse in response to Adam and Eve's partaking of the fruit makes it difficult to argue that their decision was wise, and that the argument that they were following a higher law requires them to take advice from the serpent. She questions the interpretation of considering Eve eating the fruit a transgression but not a sin. Smith argues this distinction does not exist in the Book of Mormon, and she sees no evidence that a transgression would be wise. She concludes that the "Wise Choice Theory" is not supported by the Book of Mormon.

Early Latter-day Saint leaders Orson Pratt, George Q. Cannon, and Brigham Young regarded Adam wisely chose to eat the fruit wise but thought Eve was not, and Smith argues that "in the earliest layers of LDS interpretation, Eve’s choice was not seen as wise". Morrill, agreeing that the Book of Mormon text itself does not heroize Eve, reports that most Latter-day Saint women's literature in the nineteenth century considered Eve "a wise and knowing woman" who acted as a "savior figure" by "safely guid[ing] the course of human salvation on the right path".

=== Jacob's sermon ===
Egyptologist and CES instructor John S. Thompson analyzed Jacob’s sermon and identified themes of judgment, clothing, remembrance, creation, fasting, sacrifice, usage of God’s name, repentance, and the Law of Moses. On another note, author Marilyn Arnold suggests that, based on the deliberate structure and language of his sermon, Jacob adopts his style from writings in the brass plates. Additionally, Jacob repeats words such as "body", "flesh", "die", and "death" but applies them to his teachings in a way that shifts their connotations.

=== Nephi's poetry ===
Independent scholar Matthew Nickerson identifies shared traits between what has been called "the Psalm of Nephi" and psalms of the Old Testament. Nephi’s words are specifically connected to the individual lament, each of which contains an invocation, complaint, confession of trust, petition, and vow of praise. Nickerson proposes that each of these elements can be identified, making Nephi’s psalm a true psalm. According to Fatimah Salleh and Margaret Hemming, Nephi's psalm is associated with grief over his father’s death and tensions within the family.

Richard Rust explains that Nephi incorporates certain literary aspects such as rhythms and structures similar to those found in poetry. One example is when Nephi repeats words and phrases in a way that contributes to the poetic sounds of his writings. Some of the things he repeats include "the Lord", "commanded", and "that I may walk...that I may be strict." Such repetition is emphatic, says Rust. Because of Nephi's repetition and use of Hebrew structure—which presents and then satisfies an idea—his poetry is similar to Isaiah’s. Bible and Jewish Studies professor David Bokovoy claims another connection to biblical poetry in Nephi's tendency to switch from third to first person. Bokovoy notes other examples in the Bible of the writer switching in the same passage from speaking about God at a distance to speaking to God in proximity. Additionally, Salleh and Hemming suggest that, based on the tone of the psalm, Nephi has little time to mourn his parents' deaths before he must flee from his brothers.

=== Early LDS interpretation ===
Second Nephi 28 mentions that priests of different churches will "contend" with each other and teach without the Holy Ghost. Early members of the Church of Jesus Christ of Latter-day Saints saw many competing religions and began to interpret Joseph Smith's visit to the Sacred Grove to ask God which church was right as fulfillment of this prophecy. Second Nephi 29 goes on to describe a new book of scripture that would be revealed but rejected by many people because they already had the Bible. According to early church leader Heber C. Kimball, the response of many ministers was often "we need no more revelation", which he declared as fulfillment of the chapter 29 prophecy.

Joseph of Egypt's prophecy quoted in Second Nephi 3 was also interpreted by early church members, who believed Joseph Smith to be "the choice seer" with the same name as his father.

=== The Isaiah chapters ===
==== Intertextuality ====
Nephi quotes extensively from the Book of Isaiah throughout 1 and 2 Nephi, with passages largely appearing as they do in the Bible. Elizabeth Fenton describes these passages as "not-quite-exact copying", with differences being minor. J.N. Washburn, an independent scholar, cites that 199 of 433 verses from Isaiah appear with the same wording and proposes that Joseph Smith used the King James Bible version whenever it was close enough to the original meaning of the plates he was said to be translating and used the new translation when meaning differed. According to author H. Clay Gorton, 2 Nephi 21 is the only Isaiah-quoted chapter in the Book of Mormon that, when compared to the KJV, sustains no textual differences. In a similar vein, 2 Nephi 22 and Isaiah 12 are different only by one word. Gorton has concluded that, where Isaiah verses differ in the Book of Mormon, approximately 38% of those changes are extensive.

Philosopher Joseph Spencer calls Isaiah "the honored keynote speaker of the small plates". Spencer also emphasizes that even beyond quotations, Jacob and Nephi's teachings both seem to be built on further ideas of Isaiah's. A scholar involved in early studies of the Book of Mormon, Sidney Sperry, suggests that by including Isaiah's writings, Nephi points out the mission of Jesus Christ, the restoration of the house of Israel, and God’s judgments that follow. Additionally, Nephi says he "delights" in Isaiah but explains that a knowledge of Jewish tradition is needed to understand his writings, according to literary critic Michael Austin. Nephi admits he has chosen not to teach his people certain knowledge and traditions with which he is familiar as a former resident of Jerusalem.

Chapter comparison
2 Nephi	Isaiah
2 Nephi 7	Isaiah 50
2 Nephi 8	Isaiah 51
2 Nephi 12–24	Isaiah 2–14
2 Nephi 27	Isaiah 29

==== Deutero-Isaiah ====
In more modern times, scholars have theorized based on variation in style and structure that more than one author wrote the book of Isaiah. These authors are referred to as Isaiah, Deutero-Isaiah, and Trito-Isaiah. Deutero-Isaiah is thought to be born after the time Lehi’s family would have left Jerusalem. Many of those writings which are considered to be part of Deutero-Isaiah are cited in Second Nephi as quotations from Isaiah. This implies that the Book of Mormon narrative disagrees that this section of Isaiah was written by someone other than its namesake. An LDS doctrine course teacher's supplement cites the Book of Mormon as evidence that Isaiah wrote the whole book of Isaiah since pieces from throughout the book are said to be from the already compiled brass plates which Lehi's sons took from Jerusalem around 600 BC.

==== Chiasmus ====
Joseph Spencer suggests that Isaiah appears as a sort of chiasmus in Nephi’s record, sandwiched between Jacob’s and Nephi’s explanations of his writings. In their explanations both men discuss reconciliation with God, contributing to its chiastic appearance. Additionally, Isaiah’s teachings as they appear in Second Nephi form a chiasmus: chapters 12–15 discuss destruction relating to the covenant people; chapter 16 contains a call to repentance, and chapters 17–22 follow themes of God’s covenant people returning to him.

==== Typology ====
Biblical typology is a practice of interpretation that suggests Old Testament events are types or representations of future fulfillment of prophecy. Isaiah's writing was described in scripture as things that "have been and will be", which aligns with typology's idea that written prophecies apply both to events in the writer's own day which create a type for the future, and to the latter days. Many of the prophecies quoted from Isaiah in Second Nephi regard Babylonian captivity, which Nephi believes to have already begun. Despite this understanding, Nephi also claims the prophecies will be useful in future times. According to Isaiah analyst and Latter-day Saint Avraham Gileadi, this can be viewed either as a contradiction in the text or with the lens of Nephi viewing Isaiah typologically.

==== Isaiah and the Charles Anthon visit ====
Second Nephi 27 quotes a prophecy from Isaiah 29 in which the disregarded messages from prophets are compared to a sealed book. The book is delivered to "one who is learned", who says, "I cannot [read it] for it is sealed." In the Pearl of Great Price, another Latter-day Saint book of scripture, Martin Harris's visit to professor Charles Anthon with copied characters from the Book of Mormon is recorded. While records of the event vary between Anthon and Harris, Anthon's response as reported by Harris was "I cannot read a sealed book." Many Latter-day Saints see this visit as fulfilling Isaiah's prophecy.

=== Cultural Reception ===
Nephi's psalm has appeared in numerous works by LDS creators. One such example is Mazmuur Naafi: The Arabic Psalm of Nephi by Ahmed Jamal Qureshi. In this work of visual art, the psalm is translated into Arabic and shaped into a circle. The color of the piece, author Josh E. Probert explains, points to blue tiles found inside mosques. Around the circle with the psalm are four smaller circles. Inside the circles are the names Lehi, Nephi, Moroni, and Joseph as figures related to the Book of Mormon's content. Nephi's psalm has also been set to music, including "I Love the Lord" and "Sometimes My Soul" by John Tanner, as well as "I Glory in My Jesus" written by Millennial Choirs and Orchestras founders Brandon and Brett Stewart.

== See also ==
- First Nephi
- Nephi, son of Lehi
- The Book of Mormon Movie, Vol. 1: The Journey

== Sources ==
- Arnold, Marilyn (1996). Sweet is the Word: Reflections on the Book of Mormon, Its Narrative, Teachings, and People. American Fork, Utah: Covenant Communications. pp. 49–59. ISBN 1-55503-925-1.
- Austin, Michael (2024). The Testimony of Two Nations: How the Book of Mormon Reads, and Rereads, the Bible. University of Illinois Press. ISBN 9780252045356.
- Axelgard, Frederick W. (1986). "1 and 2 Nephi: An Inspiring Whole". BYU Studies Quarterly. 26 (4): 54 – via ScholarsArchive.
- Frederick, Nicholas J. (2024). "'Atonement' in the Book of Mormon". In Green, Deidre Nicole; Huntsman, Eric D. (eds.). Latter-day Saint Perspectives on Atonement. University of Illinois Press.
- Gardner, Brant (2007). Second Witness. Volume 2 Second Nephi—Jacob. Vol. 2. Greg Kofford Books. ISBN 978-1-58958-042-8. Wikidata Q123118216.
- Givens, Terryl L. (2009). The Book of Mormon: A Very Short Introduction. Oxford University Press. doi:10.1093/actrade/9780195369311.001.0001. ISBN 978-0-19-936567-8. Wikidata Q114004901.
- Givens, Terryl L. (2020). 2nd Nephi. Brief Theological Introductions. Maxwell Institute. ISBN 978-0-8425-0008-1. LCCN 2019954825. Wikidata Q123273667.
- Gorton, H. Clay (1994). "Biblical Texts". The Legacy of the Brass Plates of Laban: A Comparison of Biblical & Book of Mormon Isaiah Texts. Bountiful, Utah: Horizon Publishers and Distributors, Incorporated. pp. 49–51. ISBN 0-88290-511-2.
- Hardy, Grant, ed. (2023). The Annotated Book of Mormon. Oxford University Press. ISBN 978-0-19-008220-8. OL 46783409M. Wikidata Q122259222.
- Mason, Patrick Q. (2023). "The Psalm of Nephi in an Age of Anxiety and Division". BYU Studies Quarterly. 62 (3): 39.
- Mauss, Armand (2003). All Abraham's Children: Changing Mormon Conceptions of Race and Lineage. University of Illinois Press. ISBN 978-0-252-09183-4. Wikidata Q124538725.
- Morrill, Susanna (2005). "Women and the Book of Mormon: The Creation and Negotiation of a Latter-day Saint Tradition". In Engler, Steven; Grieve, Gregory P. (eds.). Historicizing 'Tradition' in the Study of Religion. Walter de Gruyter. pp. 127–144. ISBN 978-3-11-018875-2.
- Smith, Julie M. (2017). "Paradoxes in Paradise". Fleeing the Garden: Reading Genesis 2–3. Provo, UT: Neal A. Maxwell Institute for Religious Scholarship, Brigham Young University. ISBN 9780842530095.
- Morgan, Jacob (Spring 2006). "The Divine-Infusion Theory: Rethinking the Atonement". Dialogue: A Journal of Mormon Thought. 39 (1): 57–81. doi:10.2307/45227309. JSTOR 45227309.
- Mueller, Max Perry (August 2017). Race and the Making of the Mormon People. North Carolina: University of North Carolina Press. ISBN 9781469633763.
- Probert, Josh E. (2006). "Understanding 'Mazmuur Naafi: The Arabic Psalm of Nephi'". BYU Studies. 45 (4): 185.
- Rust, Richard Dilworth (1997). Feasting Upon the Word: The Literary Testimony of the Book of Mormon. Deseret Book Company. ISBN 1-57345-204-1. Wikidata Q124214275.
- Salleh, Fatimah; Hemming, Margaret (2020). The Book of Mormon for the Least of These Vol. 1. Vol. 1. By Common Consent Press. ISBN 978-1-948218-23-8. Wikidata Q123378840.
- Smith, George D. (1983). "Isaiah Updated". Dialogue. 16 (2): 45–46.
- Smith, Robert. F; Thomasson, Gordon C.; Welch, John W. (1992). "What Did Charles Anthon Really Say?". In Welch, John W. (ed.). Reexploring the Book of Mormon: The FARMS Updates. Foundation for Ancient Research and Mormon Studies. p. 73.
- Spencer, Joseph M. (2016a). Written at Provo, Utah. Miller, Adam S.; Spencer, Joseph M. (eds.). An Other Testament: On Typology. Groundwork (2nd ed.). Brigham Young University: Neal A. Maxwell Institute for Religious Scholarship. pp. 33–68. ISBN 978-0-8425-2869-6.
- Thomas, John Christopher (2016). A Pentecostal Reads the Book of Mormon: A Literary and Theological Introduction. CPT Press. ISBN 978-1-935931-55-3. Wikidata Q123196681.
- Thompson, John S. (1997). "Isaiah 50–51, the Israelite Autumn Festivals, and the Covenant Speech of Jacob in 2 Nephi 6–10". In Parry, Donald W.; Welch, John W. (eds.). Isaiah in the Book of Mormon. Neal A. Maxwell Institute for Religious Education. pp. 123–150.
- Washburn, J.N. (1954). The Contents, Structure, and Authorship of the Book of Mormon (1st ed.). United States: Bookcraft.
- Underwood, Grant (1984). "Book of Mormon Usage in Early LDS Theology". Dialogue. 17 (3).

Second Nephi Small Plates of Nephi
Preceded by First Nephi	Book of Mormon	Succeeded by Jacob
