= Zenos =

Prophet mentioned in the Book of Mormon

According to the Book of Mormon, Zenos (/ˈziːnəs/) was an Old World prophet whose pre-Christian era writings were recorded upon the plates of brass. Zenos is quoted or paraphrased a number of times by writers in the Book of Mormon, including Nephi, Jacob, Alma, son of Alma, Nephi, son of Helaman, Samuel the Lamanite, and Mormon.

The book of Mormon says that Zenos wrote on a variety of topics, including the signs to accompany the death of the Messiah, the Atonement of Christ, and the scattering and gathering of Israel. According to one Book of Mormon writer, Zenos was killed as a result of his preaching.

== Proposed Dead Sea Scrolls connection ==
Outside of the Book of Mormon, there is no direct evidence that Zenos existed. However, some LDS apologists argue that Zenos' Book of Mormon hymn of thanksgiving and praise, which elaborates upon prayer, worship, and mercy, compares favorably in style and content with Hymn H (or 8) and Hymn J (or 10) of the Thanksgiving Hymns of the Dead Sea Scrolls.

== See also ==
- Neum (prophet)
- Sons of Zadok
- Zenock
