= Milton R. Hunter =

American author, educator and religious leader

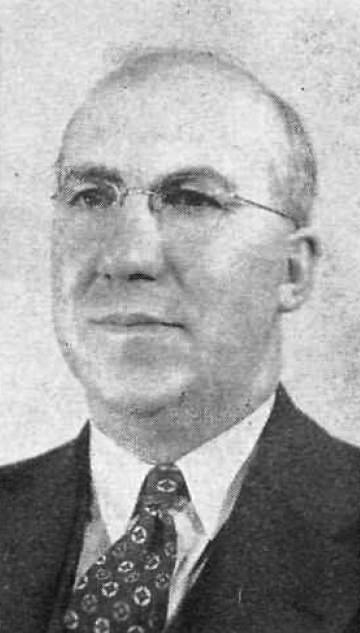

First Council of the Seventy
- April 6, 1945 – June 27, 1975
- Called by: Heber J. Grant

Personal details
- Born: Milton Reed Hunter; October 25, 1902; Holden, Utah, United States
- Died: June 27, 1975 (aged 72); Salt Lake City, Utah, United States

Milton Reed Hunter (October 25, 1902 – June 27, 1975) was an American author, educator, and religious leader in the Church of Jesus Christ of Latter-day Saints. He served as a member of the church's First Council of the Seventy from 1945 until his death in 1975.

== Biography ==
Of Scottish descent, Hunter was born in Holden, Utah, the son of John Edward and Margaret Teeples Hunter. He attended Brigham Young High School, and Brigham Young University, receiving a bachelor's degree in 1929 and a master's degree in 1931. He married Ferne Gardner in Logan, Utah, in 1931, and the couple had six children. For several years Hunter worked as a public school administrator in Nevada and Utah. His first education job was as principal of a school in St. Thomas, Nevada, a city since flooded by Lake Mead. He later taught LDS seminary courses while living in Provo, Utah.

In 1935, Hunter earned Ph.D. in history from the University of California, Berkeley. Although his professors in Berkeley encouraged him to take a university position in history, he chose to continue as a teacher of religion and moved to Logan, Utah, to teach at the Institute of Religion. Hunter spent the next 17 years as a seminary teacher.

Hunter was called to serve on the LDS Church's First Council of the Seventy and was sustained on April 6, 1945. Assignments as a general authority took him to many parts of the world, including trips to Mexico, Central America, and South America to study archaeological ruins in the context of accounts found within the Book of Mormon. Hunter was a cofounder along with Thomas Stuart Ferguson of the New World Archaeological Foundation, and is the co-author, also with Ferguson, of the book Ancient America and the Book of Mormon. First published in 1950, the book focuses on the writings of an Aztec historian Ixtlilxochitl who, in written accounts of Mesoamerican history provided to the newly arrived Europeans, appears to corroborate a number of claims made in the Book of Mormon. Hunter also served as national president of Delta Phi Kappa, a fraternity for former Mormon missionaries.

== Publications ==
During his career as a teacher and church leader, Hunter wrote 23 books, principally on religious and history oriented topics. His book Brigham Young, the Colonizer, published in 1940, was based on his dissertation. Utah in Her Western Setting was enthusiastically reviewed and was used as a text in Utah schools. However, the revised edition, published as The Utah Story, was not as well received. He also produced history and church related articles, reviews, and papers.

Although Hunter's work was well researched and clearly written, he wrote for a popular local audience and from a Mormon point of view. Utah historians Dale Morgan and Brigham D. Madsen were at times highly critical of Hunter's editing of material, his selective use of sources, and his avoidance of material detrimental to the reputation of the LDS Church. Geographer Wayne Wahlquist, in a review of literature relating to the settlement of the Utah area, noted Hunter's strengths and weaknesses as a scholar in Brigham Young, the Colonizer. Wahlquist praised Hunter for his accurate and comprehensive use of material, but noted his "superficial treatment of the colonization process, on such issues as land titles and distribution, and the types of lands settled, and for failing to recognize that the colonization process did not end with Brigham Young" (Walquist, p. 6–7). Historiographer Gary Topping, in 2003, noted that Hunter's "myopic cultural vision" was clearly apparent in his work: "Fully imbued with the patriotism, the chin-up optimism, and the faith in progress held by Mormons and other Americans during the World War II period, the books promote unrestrained industrial development and exploitation of natural resources" (Topping, p. 35). Topping also notes that Hunter's work ignores cultural diversity in the region, and portrays Native Americans in a disparaging manner.
