= Bruce Warren =

Bruce Warren may refer to:

- Bruce W. Warren (1928–2013), American professor of archeology
- Bruce A. Warren (1937–2010), American oceanographer
