= Bruce W. Warren =

Bruce W. Warren (1928-2013) was a professor of archeology at Brigham Young University. He held a Ph.D. in the subject from the University of Arizona. He coauthored The Messiah in Ancient America with Thomas Stuart Ferguson, although it is more accurate to say Warren completed this book several years after Ferguson's death.

Warren wrote his Ph.D. at the University of Arizona on the socio-cultural development of the central depression of Chiapas. Warren also wrote New Evidences of Christ in America with Blaine M. Yorgason and Harold Brown.

Warren was a Latter-day Saint. Warren has been closely involved with the work of both the Society for Early Historic Archaeology and the New World Archaeological Foundation. On occasion Warren is inaccurately credited as Bruce V. Warren.

== Sources ==
- Maxwell Institute author listing
- Scientific Commons listing of Warren's Ph.D.
- Meridian Magazine bio
- citation of a paper on Nimrod co-authored by Warren
- Deseret News Obituary
