= Chiapa de Corzo =

Chiapa de Corzo may refer to:

- Chiapa de Corzo (Mesoamerican site), a Mesoamerican archaeological site located in the Chiapas highlands, Mexico
- Chiapa de Corzo, Chiapas, the modern township and municipality, central Chiapas, Mexico
