= Santa Rosa (Mesoamerican site) =

Archaeological site in Mesoamerica

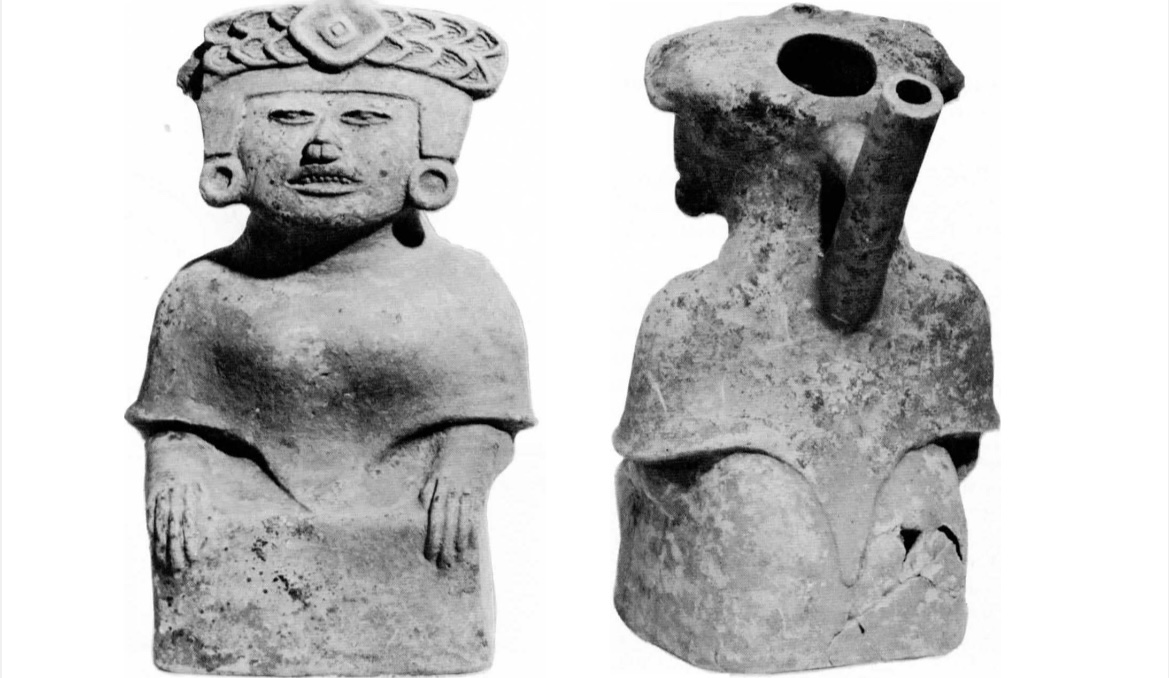
Female effigy figure found within a burial at Santa Rosa

Santa Rosa is a pre-Columbian archaeological site previously located along the Grijalva River in the current state of Chiapas, Mexico in the Chapatengo-Chejel subdistrict. It is currently inundated by water due to the construction of the Angostura dam upstream.

The site had its cultural peak during the Late Formative or Protoclassic period of Mesoamerica, between about 100 BCE and 200 CE. It was one of many ancient centers located within the Central Chiapas Depression during the Formative Period. Others include Mirador (not to be mistaken with El Mirador), Ocozocoautla, La Libertad, and Chiapa de Corzo.

== Site ==
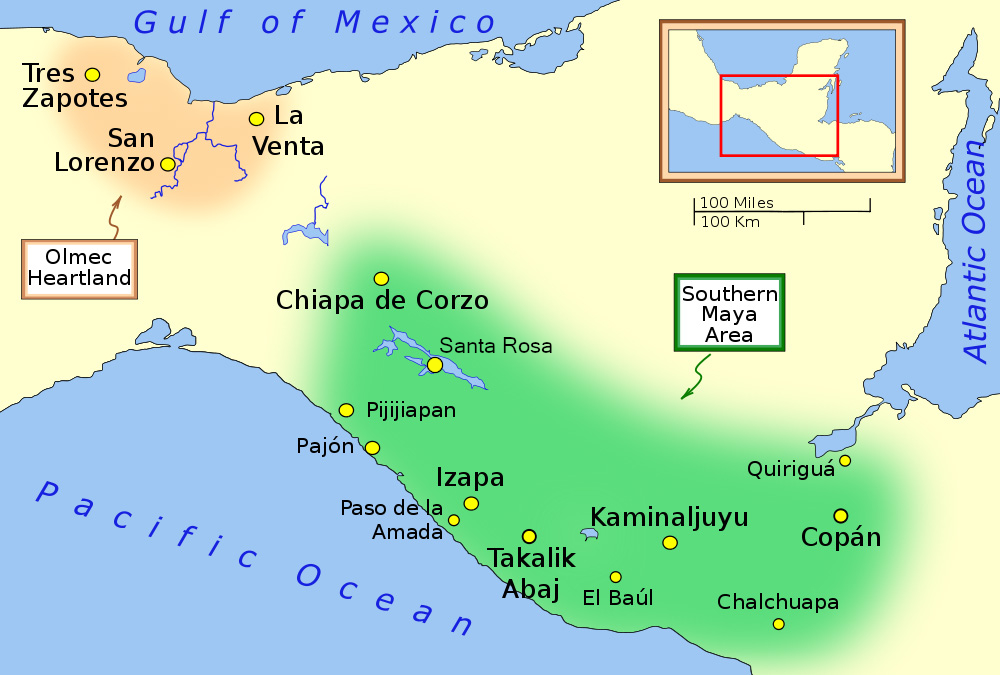
Map of Mesoamerican sites showing Santa Rosa

There are approximately 31 mounds at the site spread out over an area of about 54 hectares. Settlements directly affiliated with the center have been located from the Angostura Canyon, clear down to the Guatemalan border as evidenced by dominant Santa Rosa pottery types found in the region. Between the large center of Chiapa de Corzo further downstream, and the Guatemalan border, Santa Rosa was the largest Preclassic site along the Grijalva River. The first permanent settlement of the area dates to the early Middle Preclassic Period from around 1000 BCE to 600 BCE and was continuously occupied until about 200 CE, at which point it began to experience a decline in population.

The site is flanked by two large pyramidal mounds in what appears to be a general east–west orientation. Interestingly, unlike other sites in the region, there doesn't seem to be any formal or planned layout of the site. Mound A at the eastern end of the site stands 11 meters (36 feet) tall, and Mound W is at the western end at 14 meters (46 feet) tall. In the center of Santa Rosa is a large platform approximately 6 meters (20 feet) high, and 74 meters (243 feet) wide by 80 meters (260 feet) long. Located to the north and south of the site are what appear to be clusters of possible elite residential platforms.

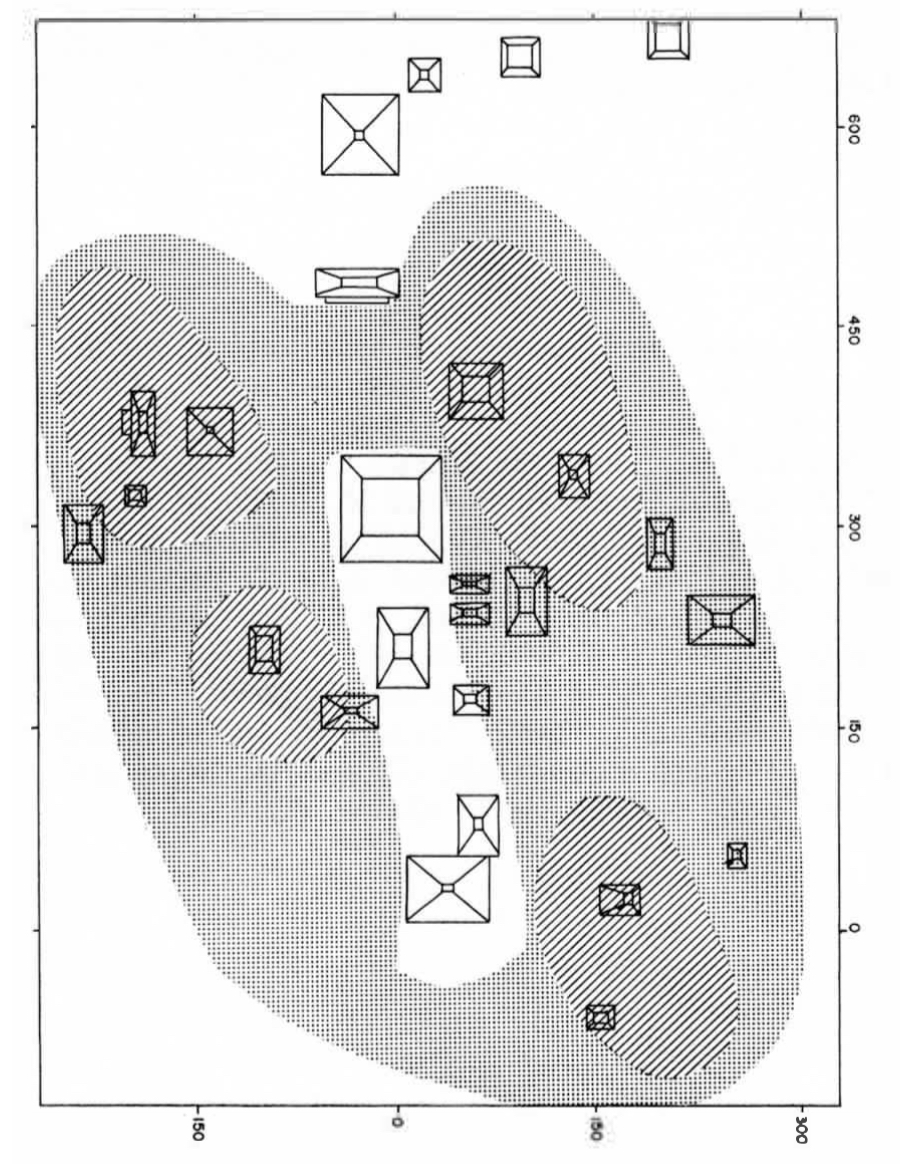
Site map of Santa Rosa showing cultural division ca. 150 BCE

A few interesting observations of the Santa Rosa archaeological site have been noted. For one, as is evidenced by the unusual layout of the site, as well as the lack of certain Mayan ceramic types, it is suggested that Santa Rosa actively resisted outside cultural influences. It appears to have maintained its own traditions while also rejecting foreign ones. There also appears to have been a linguistic, or cultural division at the site, possibly representing two distinct groups of people living together. The site has a clear division through the center by the three largest mounds, W, S, and A. During excavations of Mound S, archaeologists discovered two distinct and separate building materials, one on each half of the mound and both covered by a plaster coating. There was no overlap in materials, suggesting that possibly two separate cultural groups were working on the construction of the platform together.

== History ==
=== Middle Preclassic ===
The first evidence of site occupation begins in the Middle Preclassic Period which dates from around 1000 BCE to 500 BCE. During this time, habitation was light with pottery types showing an affiliation with Chiapa de Corzo downstream, and La Venta in the Gulf Coast area. The first pyramidal platforms were erected during this time.

=== Late Preclassic ===
During this time period, stretching from about 500 BCE to 100 BCE more advanced architecture becomes apparent. Limestone was used in the construction of many of the platforms. Burnt clay as flooring and walls with well-cut stone start to appear. Pottery also becomes more advanced and better polished.

=== Protoclassic ===
During the Protoclassic from 100 BCE to 200 CE, Santa Rosa experienced massive growth in importance and size, similar to developments elsewhere in Mesoamerica such as at Chiapa de Corzo, and Kaminaljuyu in the Guatemalan Highlands. During this period, strong Santa Rosa influences are present from the Angostura Canyon on the north, to the Guatemalan Border on the south. Many of the site mounds were constructed during this time and advanced architecture including well-cut stone, paint, and stucco is evident. New ceramic types such as effigy vessels, spouts, and fresco decorations begin to appear.

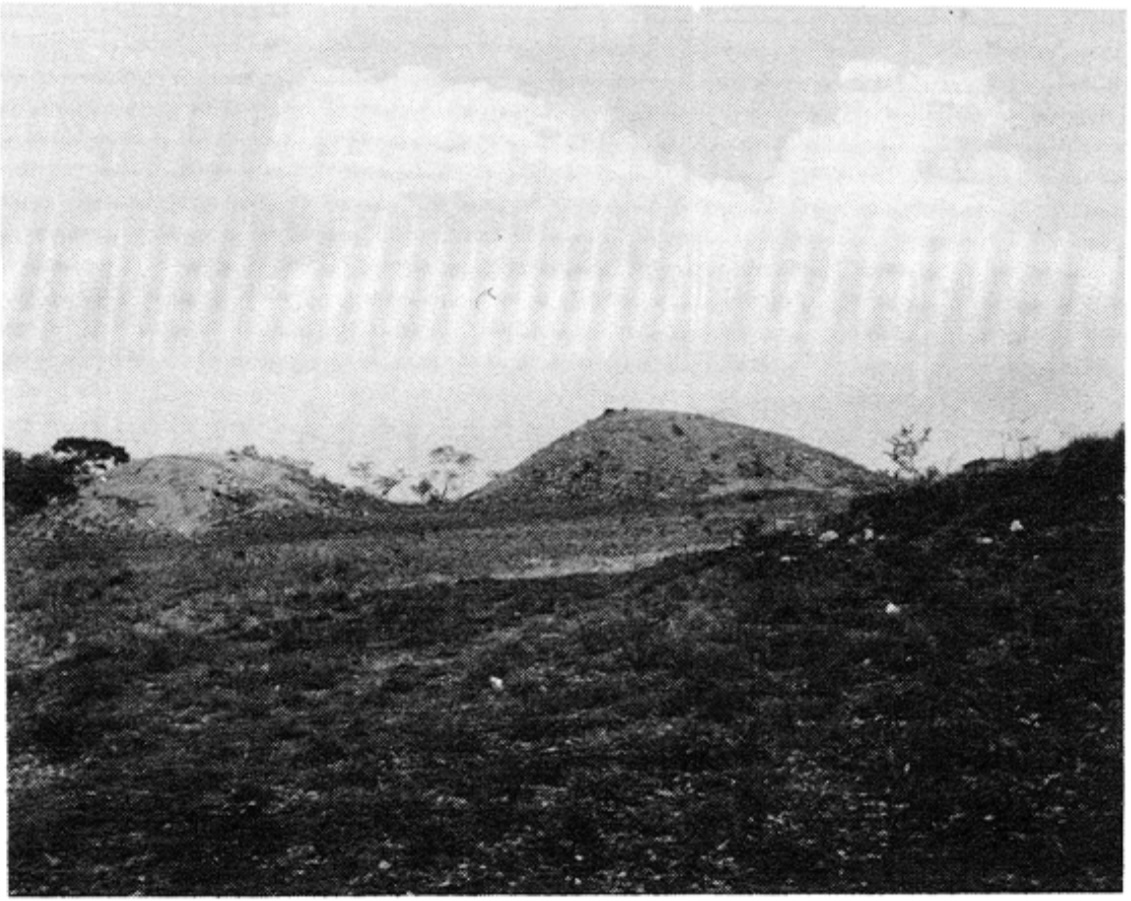
Mounds A and B at Santa Rosa

=== Classic ===
Starting around 200 CE, Santa Rosa and the Central Chiapas Depression as a whole begins to experience a considerable population decline. New pottery types from the Mayan area start to show up, indicating an intrusion of a new group of people into the region. Previous settlement patterns cease to exist, and by the end of the period, Santa Rosa is completely abandoned.

== Santa Rosa and the Book of Mormon ==
Santa Rosa is considered an important archaeological site among some members of the Church of Jesus Christ of Latter-day Saints. According to John Sorenson and other Book of Mormon scholars, Santa Rosa has many similarities to the City of Zarahemla, where a large portion of Book of Mormon history takes place.
