= Robert S. Peabody Institute of Archaeology =

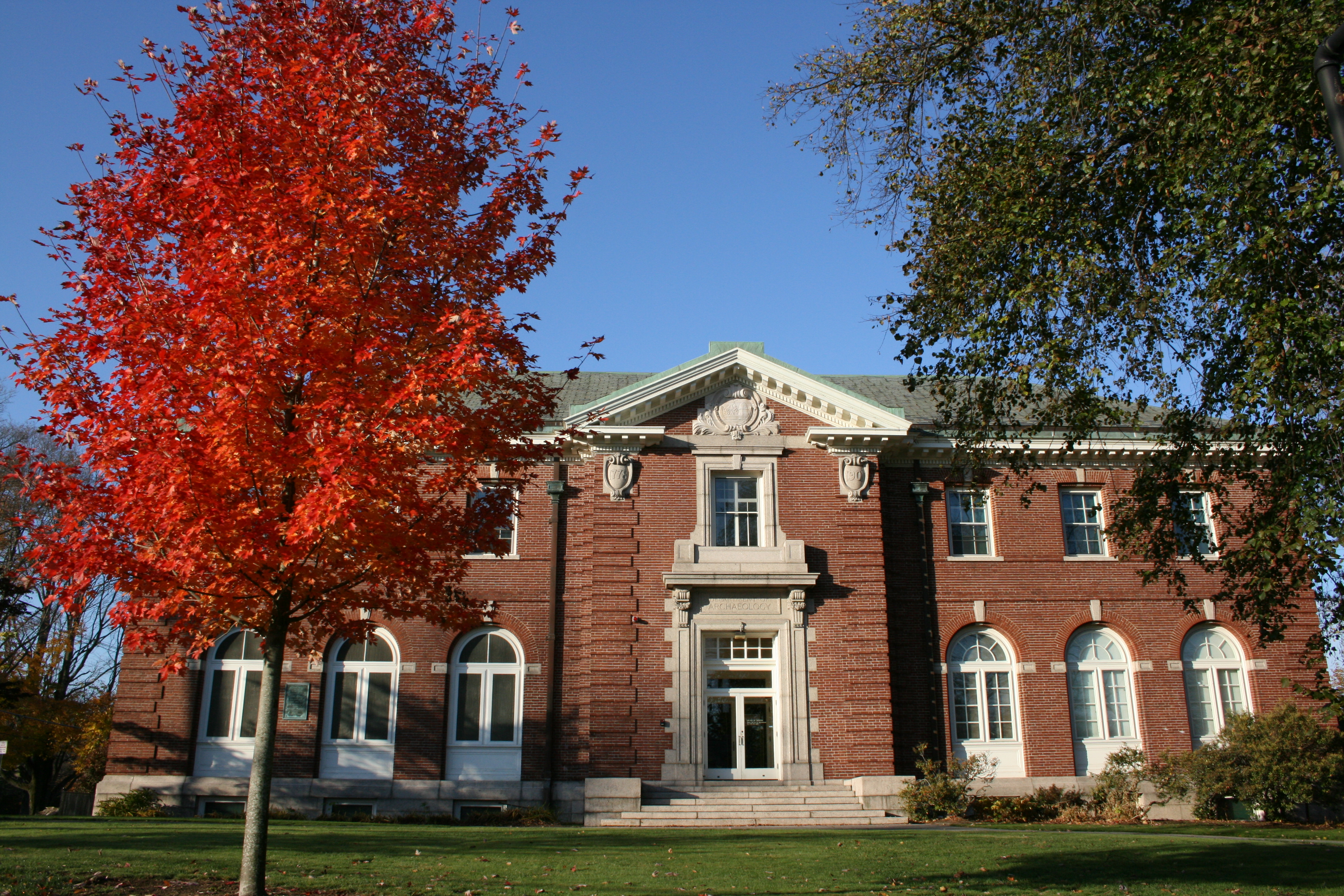
- Robert S. Peabody Institute of Archaeology
- Established: 1901
- Location: Andover, Massachusetts
- Coordinates: 42.6477°N 71.1353°W
- Type: Archaeological museum
- Collections: Artifacts and materials from various Indigenous cultures of the Americas
- Founder: Robert Singleton Peabody
- Director: Dr. Ryan Wheeler
- Website: Robert S. Peabody Institute of Archaeology

The Robert S. Peabody Institute of Archaeology, formerly known as the Robert S. Peabody Museum of Archaeology, is a learning center and archaeological collection in Andover, Massachusetts. Founded in 1901 through a bequest from Robert Singleton Peabody, 1857 Phillips Academy alumnus, the institute initially held the archaeological materials collected by Peabody from Native American cultures. Peabody's passionate interest in archaeology led him to create the institute at Phillips Academy to encourage young people's interest in the sciences, and to foster respect and appreciation for the Native American peoples who have inhabited that hemisphere for thousands of years.

The Peabody's major collections include artifacts and material from the Southwest, Northeast, Midwest, Mexico, Southeast, and the Arctic. The date range represented by these collections spans from Paleo Indian (10,000+ years ago) to the present day.

== History ==
The Robert S. Peabody Institute has served as a major center for fieldwork, research, and publication since its founding in 1901. Peabody, an 1857 graduate of Phillips Academy, established the Museum as the repository for his collection of approximately 38,000 artifacts and as a place where students could become acquainted with the discipline of archaeology. Throughout its history, the institute has been known by several names, including the Department of Archaeology, the Robert S. Peabody Foundation for Archaeology, the Robert S. Peabody Museum of Archaeology, and, most recently, the Robert S. Peabody Institute for Archaeology.

As the museum's first director, his son Charles initiated the strong emphasis on research with excavations in 1901 at the Dorr Mound, Mississippi, Jacob's Cavern, Missouri in 1903 and Bushy Cavern, Maryland in 1904, among others. His excavations used an early form of the grid system and produced some of the first well-documented evidence of man in association with extinct fauna. His 1904 report on Jacob's Cavern inaugurated the museum's long history of research and publication.

Warren K. Moorehead, appointed curator in 1901 and second director in 1924, conducted fieldwork throughout North America. He undertook extensive regional surveys and excavations in the Arkansas River Valley, Northwest Georgia, and coastal Maine from 1907 to 1938. Work at Etowah, Hopewell, the Cahokia Mounds, and “Red Paint” sites in Maine added about 200,000 objects and provided some of the most valuable early collections. Moorehead was appointed by Theodore Roosevelt to the Board of Indian Commissioners in 1909. He investigated claims of fraud at the Annishinabe Reservation at White Earth Minnesota, exposing illegal seizure of reservation land by lumber and land companies. The museum curates photographs documenting the work and gifts from Annishinabe people whose land was eventually returned.

Between 1915 and 1929 A. V. Kidder excavated sites in the Pecos Valley, New Mexico, and elsewhere in the American southwest. With Carl Guthe and Anna O. Shepard, Kidder's analysis resulted in the first full chronology of southwestern archaeology. Inspired by questions raised at Pecos, Carl Guthe and Elsie Clews Parsons conducted ethnographic studies at Jemez and San Ildefonso Pueblos in the first use of analogy with the present as a tool in archaeological interpretation. The excavations at Pecos and related sites recovered more than 25,000 artifacts. Earnest Hooton at Harvard's Peabody Museum studied the more than 2,000 sets of human remains from Pecos in the first physical anthropological study of population groups through time. In 1927 Kidder held the first Pecos conference, sponsored by Peabody, initiating regional archaeological conferences.

The third director, Douglas S. Byers, and curator Fred Johnson were national leaders in research and publication from 1938 through 1968. The Robert S. Peabody “Foundation for Archaeological Research” updated and revised cataloging, artifact storage systems, exhibits, and publications. Fieldwork was focused on identifying the New England stratigraphic sequence. Johnson pioneered interdisciplinary paleoecological analysis for archaeological interpretation, applying it first to the Boylston Street Fish Weir in 1939. Excavation of Paleoindian occupations at the Bull Brook and Debert sites during the 1950s and 60s employed Pleistocene geology as an analytical tool. Extensive work was also undertaken in the Yukon and Mexico. These excavations, plus several significant private collections, added another 200,000 objects.

The RSPM hosted the initial meeting of the Society for American Archaeology in 1935 and inaugurated the Massachusetts Archaeological Society five years later. During the 1950s Fred Johnson chaired the American Anthropological Association committee linking the needs of archaeologists with the expertise of Willard F. Libby to develop Carbon 14 dating for archaeological sites. The Peabody hosted the 1954 Conference on Radiocarbon Dating and the 1956 International Conference on Radiocarbon Dating with representatives from seven European countries, Canada, and the United States.

In 1968, Richard “Scotty” MacNeish was appointed Director. His major excavations in Mexico, Peru, and Belize investigated the origins of agriculture. MacNeish's discoveries of early corn and the pre-ceramic sequence in Mexico provided crucial insight into plant and animal domestication and the beginnings of sedentary life in the New World. This work is considered one of the most important interdisciplinary studies in 20th-century American archaeology. His contributions to archaeology were acknowledged through more than a dozen medals and honors, including his election to the National Academy of Sciences in 1974. The Museum curates the type collections published in the Tehuacan volumes and the personal papers, field notes, maps, photographs, and publications constituting the MacNeish library and archives.

The museum was dormant after MacNeish's 1983 departure until the arrival of James W. Bradley in 1990. Bradley renamed the institution the Robert S. Peabody Museum of Archaeology and revived the museum's research and educational functions, achieved broad use of the museum's resources within Phillips Academy, inaugurated highly successful expeditionary learning programs, and reactivated the Research Associate program. Innovative work directed toward NAGPRA compliance resulted in a national model for partnerships with tribes. Bradley's emphasis on collection management, acquisition of significant private collections, and building relations with Native communities, avocational archaeologists, educators, and professional museum and archaeology constituencies, rebuilt the museum's national significance.

In November 2017, the Robert S. Peabody Museum of Archaeology was renamed the Robert S. Peabody Institute of Archaeology to more accurately reflect the institution's mission and to avoid confusion with other similarly named institutions.

== Collections ==
The Robert S. Peabody Institute curates artifacts, archives, books, and images that pertain to Indigenous cultures of the Americas, past and present. These materials reflect a century of archaeological field research, much of which was cutting-edge science for its time. They also mirror the diverse interests of Peabody directors and curators. While not a primary focus, the museum also curates a small collection of European Paleolithic material as well as several small post-contact historical archaeology collections.

The Peabody artifact collections are organized into three distinct categories: research, education, and comparative collections. The strengths of the three collection categories are well documented, particularly the archaeological research collection which continues to be an important resource for professional scholarly research. The Peabody archives, library, and image collections support the museum's artifact collections and serve as a resource for the Phillips Academy, archaeological, scholarly, Native, and museum communities as well as the public on occasion.

The primary users of the Peabody collections are:

- Phillips Academy faculty and students through student work duty, classroom visits and collections tours, and independent projects.
- Archaeological, scholarly, and museum communities through research queries, visits, publications, and artifact loans.
- Native communities through research and repatriation requests primarily in connection with the Native American Graves Protection and Repatriation Act.
- Massachusetts Archaeological Society Northeast Chapter members, the general public, and other interested groups through attendance at lectures, exhibits, and/or education programs.

== NAGPRA ==
The Native American Graves Protection and Repatriation Act (NAGPRA) was passed in 1990 and provides a process for museum and federal agencies to return human remains, funerary objects, sacred objects, and objects of cultural patrimony to their descendent Native American Communities. The Peabody Museum is in full compliance with the NAGPRA law for culturally affiliated materials.

In 1999, the Peabody took part in the largest American repatriation to date in collaboration with the Peabody Museum of Archaeology and Ethnology at Harvard University and the Pecos National Historic Park. Together they returned approximately 2,000 sets of human remains and 1,020 burial and ceremonial objects to the Pueblo of Jemez. Most of the human remains had been housed at the Harvard Peabody while the majority of the artifacts were returned by the RSPM. These remains were from sites within the Pecos Valley, including Pecos Pueblo, Rowe Ruin, Loma, Lothrop, and Dick's Ruin, outside of Santa Fe, New Mexico. Pecos Pueblo was excavated by A.V. Kidder from 1915 to 1929. Artifacts uncovered by Kidder were sent back to the RSPM and Harvard. The Pecos repatriation remains the largest single repatriation in NAGPRA history and has fostered an ongoing relationship between the Pueblo of Jemez, Pecos Pueblo National Historic Park, and the Robert S. Peabody Museum.
