= John L. Sorenson =

American anthropologist, scholar, and author (1924–2021)

John L. Sorenson

John Leon Sorenson (April 8, 1924 – December 8, 2021) was an American anthropologist, scholar and author. He was a professor of anthropology at Brigham Young University, and the author of An Ancient American Setting for the Book of Mormon, as well as many other books and articles on the Book of Mormon and archaeology.

== Life and career ==
Sorenson was born on April 8, 1924. He first performed archaeological work in Mesoamerica while pursuing a master's degree at BYU. From January to June 1953, he was involved in the New World Archaeological Foundation's initial fieldwork (under the direction of Pedro Armillas) in the state of Tabasco in Mexico.

Sorenson held a Ph.D. from the University of California, Los Angeles. He began teaching at BYU in 1963, and later established the university's anthropology department. He also served as head of Social Sciences for General Research Corporation, based in Santa Barbara, California, and was the founder of Bonneville Research Corporation. For a time, he served as editor of the Journal of Book of Mormon Studies.

He authored or co-authored some 200 books and articles, including Mormon's Codex: An Ancient American Book (2013), An Ancient American Setting for the Book of Mormon (1985), Transoceanic Culture Contacts between the Old and New Worlds in Pre-Columbian Times: A Comprehensive Annotated Bibliography (with Martin Raish, 1988), Images of Ancient America: Visualizing Book of Mormon Life (1998), Mormon’s Map (2000), and World Trade and Biological Exchanges before 1492 (with Carl L. Johannessen, 2004).

While being a proponent of the historicity of the Book of Mormon, Sorenson also attacked the poor scholarship that some have used in defending the Book of Mormon.

Sorenson was the father of eight children, all boys, and had one adopted daughter, as well as 23 grandchildren, and 10 great-grandchildren. He also served as bishop of the BYU 99th Ward. He died on December 8, 2021, at the age of 97.

== See also ==
- M. Wells Jakeman
- Thomas Stuart Ferguson
