= Jacobs Cavern =

Archaeological site in McDonald County, Missouri, US

- Interactive map of Jacobs Cavern
- Location: East of Pineville, McDonald County, Missouri, U.S.
- Coordinates: 36.59°N 94.34°W
- Depth: 14 m
- Length: 21 m
- Discovery: 1903
- Geology: St. Joe Formation (Mississippian)
- Entrances: 1

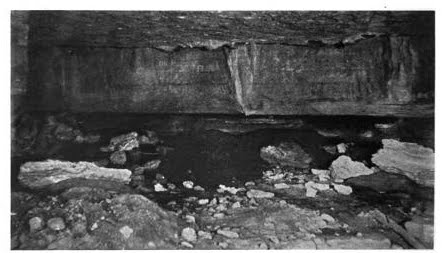
A glimpse of the interior of Jacobs Cavern

Jacobs Cavern is a cave or rock shelter east of Pineville in McDonald County, Missouri.

== History ==
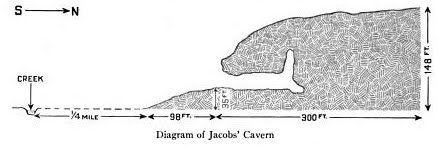
Diagram of Jacobs Cavern

Jacobs Cavern is named after its discoverer, E. H. Jacobs of Bentonville, Arkansas. It was scientifically explored by him, in company with Charles Peabody and Warren K. Moorehead, in 1903. The findings were published in that year by Jacobs in the Benton County Sun; by C. N. Gould in Science, July 31, 1903; by Peabody in the Am. Anthropologist, Sept. 903; and in the Am. Journ. Archaeology, 1904; and by Peabody and Moorehead, 1904, as Bulletin I. of the Dept. of Archaeology in Phillips Academy, Andover, Massachusetts, in the museum of which are exhibits, maps, and photographs.

Jacobs Cavern is a small cave, hardly more than a rock shelter, and is entirely in the St. Joe Formation of the Mississippian subperiod. Its roof is a single flat stratum of limestone; its walls are well marked by lines of stratification; dripstone also partly covers the walls, fills a deep fissure at the end of the cave, and spreads over the floor, where it mingles with an ancient bed of ashes, forming an ash-breccia (mostly firm and solid) that encloses fragments of sandstone, flint spalls, flint implements, charcoal and bones. Underneath is the true floor of the cave, a mass of homogeneous yellow clay, one meter in thickness. It holds scattered fragments of limestone, and is itself the result of limestone degeneration. The length of the opening is over 21 meters; its depth 14 meters, and the height of roof above the undisturbed ash deposit varied from 1 m 20 cm to 2 m 60 cm The bone recess at the end was from 50 cm. to 80 cm. in height. The stratum of ashes was from 50 cm to 1 m 50 cm thick.

The ash surface was staked off into square meters, and the substance carefully removed in order. Each stalactite, stalagmite and pilaster was measured, numbered, and removed in sections. Six human skeletons were found buried in the ashes. Seven-tenths of a cubic metre of animal bones were found: deer, bear, wolf, raccoon, opossum, beaver, buffalo, elk, turkey, woodchuck, tortoise and hog; all contemporary with man's occupancy. Three stone metates, one stone axe, one celt and fifteen hammerstones were found. Jacobs Cavern was peculiarly rich in flint knives and projectile points. The sum total amounts to 419 objects, besides hundreds of fragments, cores, spalls and rejects, retained for study and comparison. Considerable numbers of bone or horn awls were found in the ashes, as well as fragments of pottery, but no ceremonial objects.

The rude type of the implements, the absence of fine pottery, and the peculiarities of the human remains, indicate a trace of occupants more ancient than the mound-builders. The deepest implement observed was buried 50 cm under the stalagmitic surface. Dr. Hovey has proved that the rate of stalagmitic growth in Wyandotte Cave, Indiana, is .0254 cm. annually; and if that was the rate in Jacobs Cavern, 1968 years would have been needed for the embedding of that implement. Polished rocks outside the cavern and pictographs in the vicinity indicate the work of a prehistoric race earlier than the Osage Indians, who were the historic owners previous to the advent of Europeans.
