= John E. Clark =

American archaeologist

John Edward Clark (born January 16, 1952) is an American archaeologist and academic researcher of pre-Columbian Mesoamerican cultures. He was a professor of anthropology at Brigham Young University (BYU) and director of the New World Archaeology Foundation.

Clark pursued undergraduate and postgraduate studies in archaeology and anthropology at BYU, completing a B.A. in 1976 and obtaining his master's degree in 1979. His doctorate studies were completed at University of Michigan, from where he was awarded his PhD in 1994.

Clark wrote and lectured extensively theoretical topics and the archaeology of Mesoamerica, where he has particularly focused on the Olmecs and their culture. He also wrote papers on the Book of Mormon and archaeology.

Among the books Clark was involved in writing is Olmec Art and Archaeology in Mesoamerica.

Clark lived in and performed extensive archaeological research while living and working in Mexico for several decades.

In 2005 Clark was one of the speakers at the Worlds of Joseph Smith symposium at the Library of Congress.
