= Mirador (Maya site) =

Pre-Columbian archaeological site

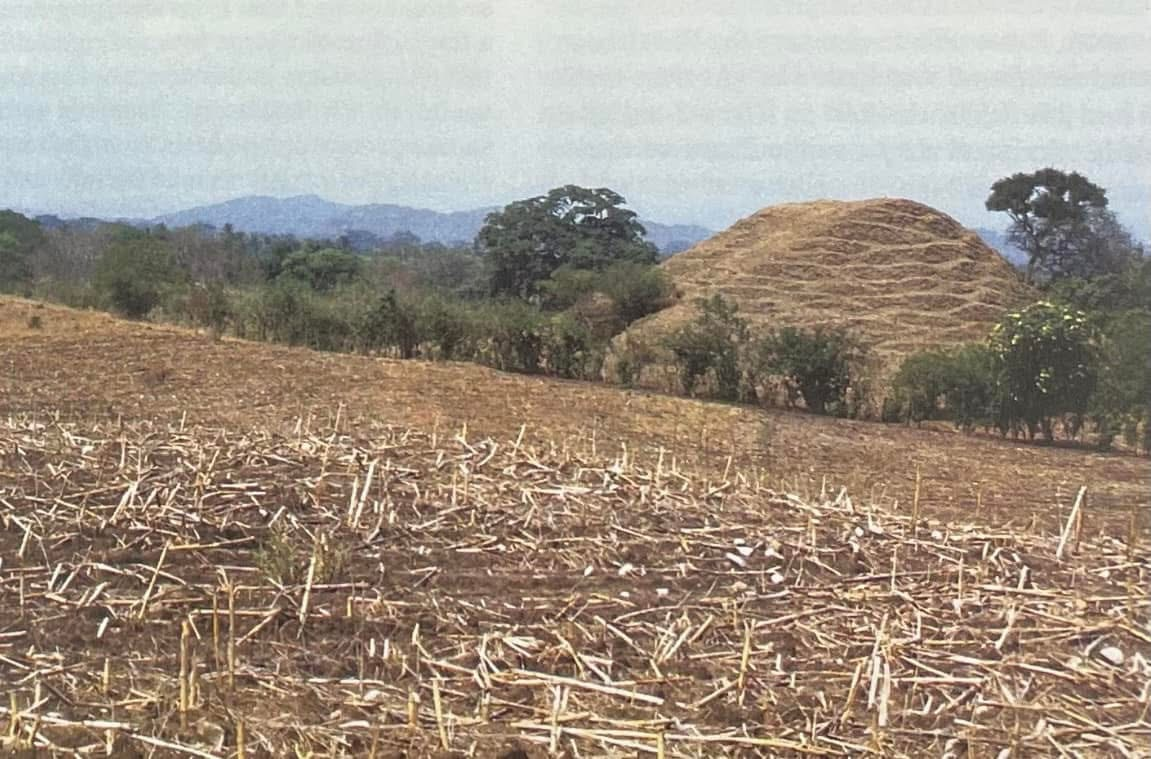
Mound 20 at Mirador post excavation

Mirador is a pre-Columbian archaeological site located in the northwestern corner of the Central Chiapas Depression in the state of Chiapas, Mexico. It is located alongside the La Venta River near the town of Vicente Guerrero in Jiquipilas.

Mirador had its cultural peak from the Middle Formative to Early Classic periods from around 500 BCE to 400 AD, however, the site has a history of settlement dating back to 1200 BCE. Mirador existed alongside several ancient Zoquean cities throughout the Central Depression during this time, including Chiapa de Corzo, Santa Rosa, La Libertad, Ocozocoautla, and San Isidro.

== Site ==
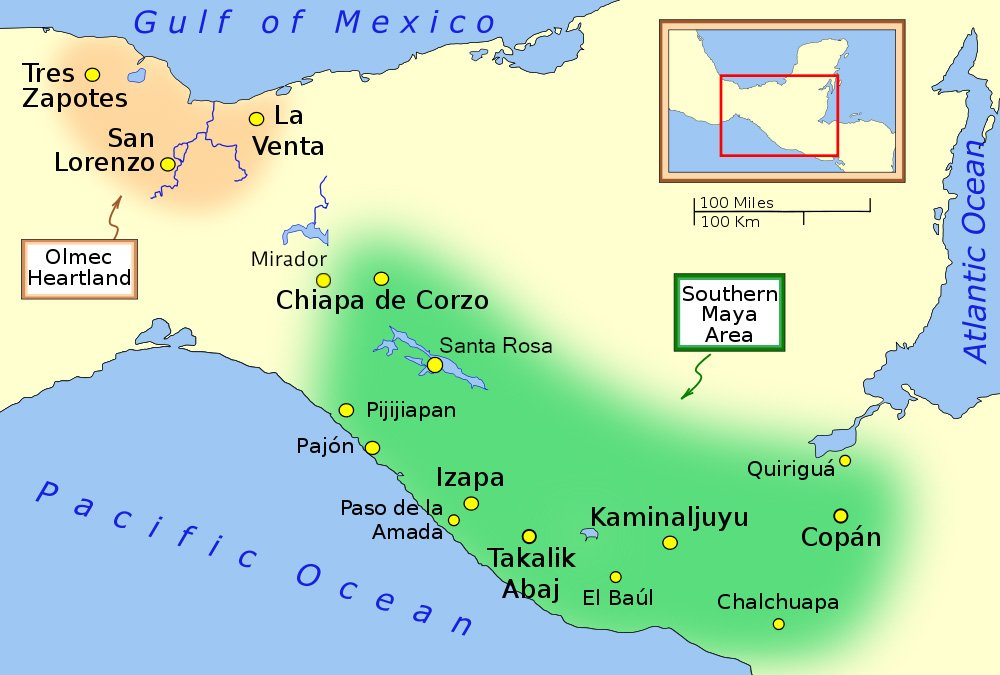
Map of Mesoamerican sites showing Mirador

Mirador occupies a strategic corridor along an ancient trade route connecting the Gulf and Pacific Coasts and Highland Guatemala. It had been nearly continuously inhabited from Olmec times, starting around 1200 BCE until its abandonment in the Early to Middle Classic period around 400-500 CE.

The site itself consists of 32 mounds spread out over an area of about 2 sq. km, with several smaller ones outside its immediate vicinity. It features a well-defined ceremonial core, dominated by several large platforms and pyramids, including the 15-meter-tall mound 20, the 8.5-meter-tall mound 10, and the large mound 27 ceremonial platforms. Mirador consists of a site plan followed by many other ancient cities in Chiapas known as the Middle Formative Chiapas (MFC) complex. Originating with the Olmec city of La Venta, this layout generally includes a large pyramid (in this case, mound 20) facing a long platform (mound 25), and associated with a large ceremonial acropolis (mound 27).

== History ==
=== Early Preclassic ===
Mirador first shows evidence of occupation during the Early Preclassic period, starting around 1200-1100 BCE. It appears to have originally been built as an Olmec outpost for mining iron ore, such as ilmenite and hematite. During this time, ceramics show a strong connection to the Olmec site of San Lorenzo, facilitating communication between that city to centers along the Soconusco region of the Pacific Coast. Several additional Olmec-style artifacts have been found in the area including celts and jade figurines.

=== Middle Preclassic ===
Between 750 and 500 BCE, Mirador experienced significant growth. During this Middle Preclassic phase, the majority of the mounds at the site were constructed, and it became a regional center. What began as multiple smaller platforms at the beginning of this phase became large, stepped platforms by the end. Construction of the mounds during this period followed a similar layout to that of La Venta, suggesting a continued important connection to the Olmec heartland. Additional architecture included the construction of stone drains and an artificial pond.

=== Late Preclassic ===
It was during the Late Preclassic between 500 BCE and 200 CE, that Mirador reached its apogee as a city. The beginning of this phase saw most of the construction of several large mounds, including mounds 9, 10, and 20. These mounds contained elite trade goods, such as jade beads, stingray spines, and polychrome ceramics, indicating the site's importance as a regional trade and ceremonial center.

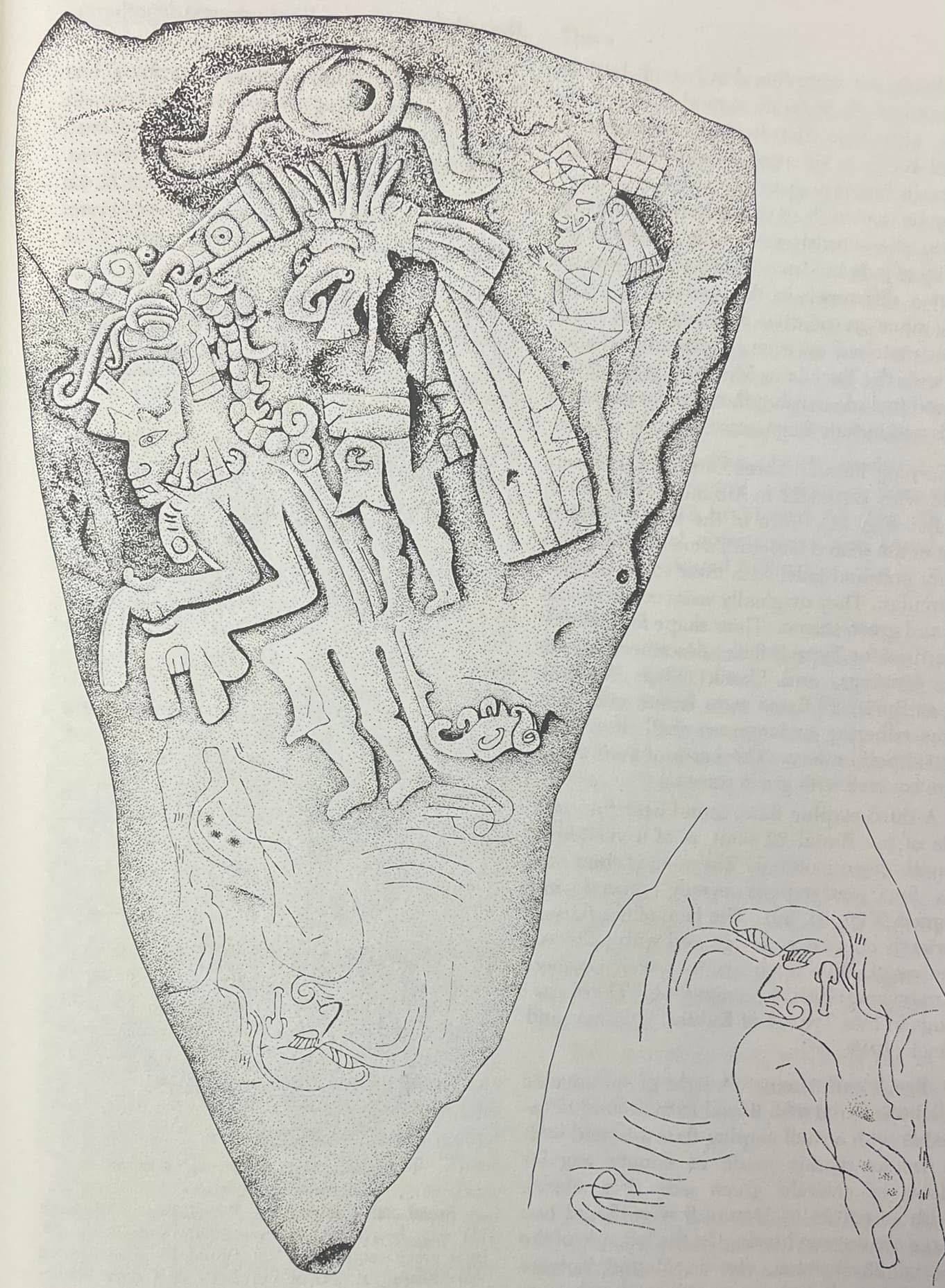
Stela 1 from mound 10 at Mirador

By about 200-1 BCE, Mirador became increasingly insular, creating its own pottery and figurine style apart from an apparent connection with the Izapa sculptural tradition. It is during this time that the site became focused on craft production, rather than ceremonial practices, as is evidenced by the cessation of building of certain structures, the lack of burials and offerings, and its export of ceramics.

It has been assumed that these societal changes could have been the result of a rise in conflict or hostilities. The only natural hill within the site (mound 32) was fortified, its population started to inhabit defensible arroyos, and its largest pyramid (mound 20) became neglected, possibly due to a decentralization of the population. These dynamics may be due, in part, to the expansion of the Maya people during the Late Preclassic, as has been attributed to sites elsewhere throughout the Chiapas Depression. Regardless, Mirador continued to be a regional city and craft production site until the end of the period.

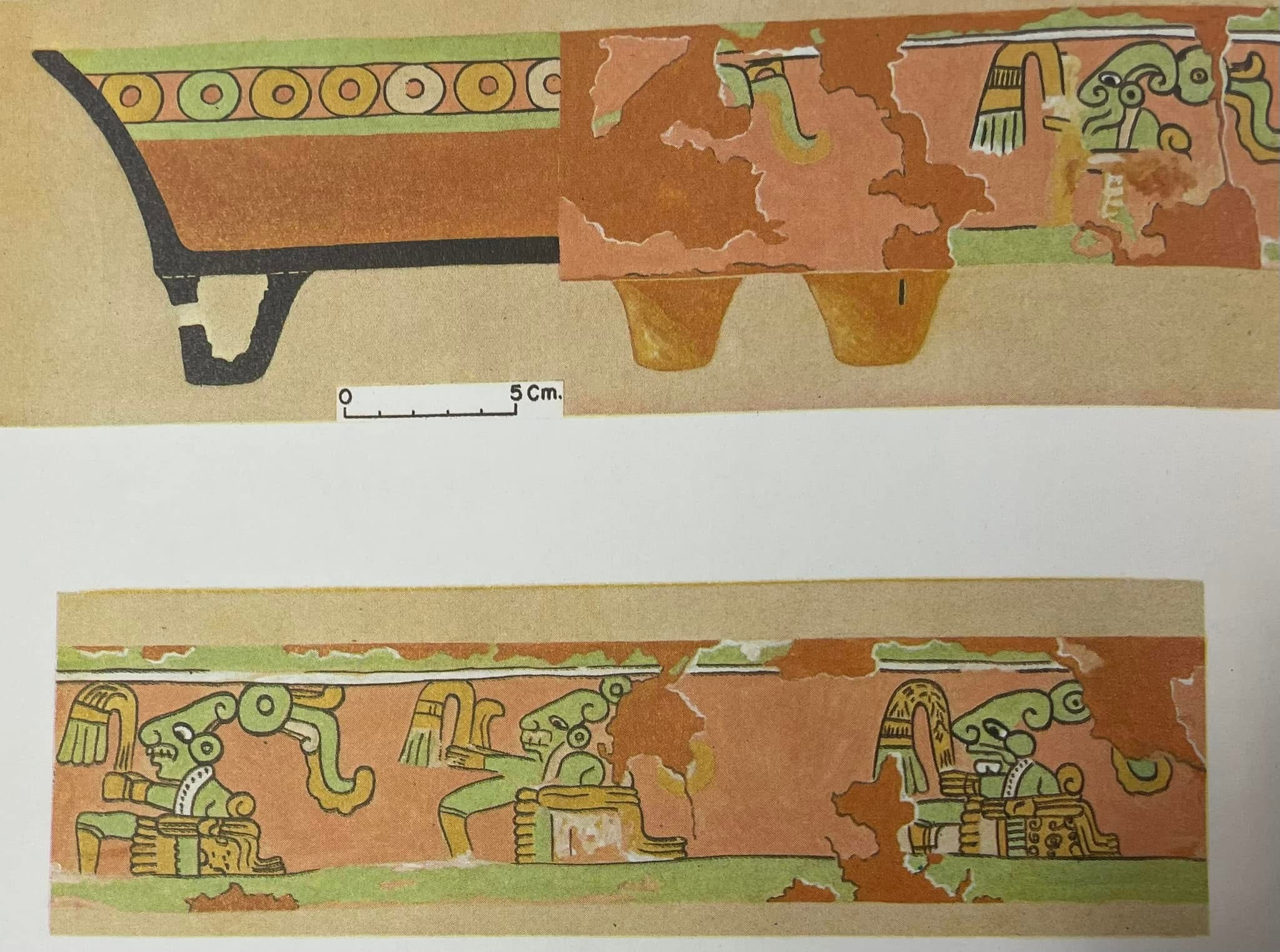
Vessel from burial 8 of mound 20 at Mirador

=== Early to Middle Classic ===
The Early to Middle Classic period at Mirador is marked by cultural and architectural continuity from the previous phase. Some mounds continued to be built upon, and the site remained focused on insularity and craft production. Sometime between 300 and 500 AD, Mirador experienced the violent and abrupt arrival of Teotihuacan influences, which coincided with the burning of mound 10, plundering of its earlier tombs, human sacrifices, and the complete restructuring of pyramid 20. Following several hundred years of Teotihuacan presence, Mirador was completely abandoned.

== Notable finds ==
There have been several notable finds throughout the excavation of this site. First, it was discovered that Mirador contained some of the earliest ceremonial architecture in Mesoamerica in mound 27. Second, some of the oldest "surviving" Mayan books were found at Mirador, following the discovery of two codex fragments. Lastly, Mirador is one of the only sites in the Central Chiapas Depression with significant evidence of being completely dominated and used by Teotihuacan as a potential outpost.
