= Alfred V. Kidder =

American archaeologist (1885–1963)

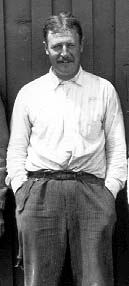
- Alfred V. Kidder at Pecos, 1916
- Born: October 29, 1885; Marquette, Michigan
- Died: June 11, 1963 (aged 77); Cambridge, Massachusetts
- Education: Harvard University (Ph.D.)(1914)
- Awards: Viking Fund Medal (1946)
- Scientific career
- Fields: archaeology

Alfred Vincent Kidder (October 29, 1885 – June 11, 1963) was an American archaeologist considered the foremost of the southwestern United States and Mesoamerica during the first half of the 20th century. He saw a disciplined system of archaeological techniques as a means to extend the principles of anthropology into the prehistoric past and so was the originator of the first comprehensive, systematic approach to North American archaeology.

== Early life ==
Born in Marquette, Michigan, Kidder was the son of a mining engineer. He entered Harvard College with the intention of qualifying for medical school, but found himself uninspired by premedical courses. He applied for a summer job in archaeology with the University of Utah in 1907. Kidder spent two successive summers in the mesa and canyon country of southwestern Colorado, southeastern Utah and areas of New Mexico. Kidder and Jesse L. Nusbaum (later Superintendent of Mesa Verde National Park), came to the Mesa Verde area with ethnologist Jesse Walter Fewkes to conduct an archaeological survey and to photograph ruins. He obtained his bachelor's degree at Harvard in 1908 and a doctorate in anthropology in 1914.

== Archaeological career ==
Kidder then embarked on a series of expeditions to the Southwest, many in northeastern Arizona. These expeditions were sponsored by Harvard's Peabody Museum of Archaeology and Ethnology and the associated Robert S. Peabody Museum of Archaeology at Phillips Academy in Andover, Massachusetts.

From 1915 to 1929, Kidder conducted site excavations at an abandoned pueblo near Pecos, New Mexico, now the Pecos National Historical Park. He excavated levels of human occupation at the pueblo going back more than 2000 years, and gathered a detailed record of cultural artifacts, including a large collection of pottery fragments and human remains. From these items, he was able to establish a continuous record of pottery styles from 2000 years ago to the mid-to-late 19th century. Kidder then analyzed trends and changes in pottery styles in association with changes in the Pecos people's culture and established a basic chronology for the Southwest. With Samuel J. Guernsey, he established the validity of a chronological approach to cultural periods. (Note: Samuel J. Guernsey later became Curator of Archaeology at the Peabody Museum.) Kidder asserted that deductions about the development of human culture could be obtained through a systematic examination of stratigraphy and chronology in archaeological sites. This research laid the foundation for modern archaeological field methods, shifting the emphasis from a "gentlemanly adventure" adding items such as whole pots and cliff dwellings to museum coffers to the study of potsherds and other artifacts in relation to the cultural history. Pioneering archaeologists in other regions of the United States completed the transformation of professional methodology initiated by Kidder.

His Introduction to the Study of Southwestern Archaeology, published in 1924, was the first synthesis of North American prehistory based on professionally recovered empirical data. In spite of his efforts at documentation, Kidder's conclusions have sometimes been criticized for a lack of integration between his field reports and his later synthesis and interpretation of that data. However, Kidder clearly emphasized archaeology's need for a scientific "eye" in the development of fact collecting techniques and clear definitions.

In the late 1920s, Kidder started the Pecos Conferences for archaeologists and ethnologists working in the American southwest. In 1927, a temporal system of nomenclature, known as the Pecos Classification System, was established for use in southwestern sites. Archaeologists have since used the sequence, with later variations, to assign approximate dates to dozens of sites throughout the Southwest and to determine cultural ties and differences among them. The same year he was elected a Fellow of the American Academy of Arts and Sciences. He was elected to the American Philosophical Society in 1934. In 1936, Kidder was elected to the United States National Academy of Sciences in 1936. That same year, he formally used the Navajo term "Anasazi" to define a specific cultural group of people living in the southwest between approximately 200 BC and 1300 AD. This term had been casually used by excavators for many of the "ancient people" since the early explorations of Richard Wetherill, and had been informally used in the work of the Pecos Conferences.

As an associate in charge of archaeological investigations (1927–1929) and as chairman of the division of historical research (1929–1950) at the Carnegie Institution, Kidder conducted a broad-scale multidisciplinary research program in Kaminaljuyu in the Guatemalan highlands which established the framework of Maya stratigraphy. In 1939 he became honorary curator of Southwestern American archaeology at the Peabody Museum, Harvard.

In 1951, Kidder, in discussions with Thomas Stuart Ferguson and Gordon Willey of Harvard University, was instrumental in establishing a foundation dealing with the status of archaeology in Mexico and Central America. In regard to those discussions, Ferguson wrote that the three scholars agreed “...it was unfortunate that so little work was being carried on in so important an area and that something should be done to increase explorations and excavations....Despite the amazing discoveries made between 1930 and 1950, work on the Pre-Classic was virtually at a standstill in 1951. The result of the discussion was that we agreed to set up a new organization to be devoted to the Pre-Classic civilizations of Mexico and Central America—the earliest known high cultures of the New World.” The following year, the New World Archaeological Foundation (NWAF) was incorporated in California, as a nonprofit, scientific, fact-finding body.

== Native American Graves Protection and Repatriation ==
During Kidder's studies and excavations at Pecos Pueblo, particularly between 1915 and 1929, pottery and other artifacts were sent to the Robert S. Peabody Museum, Andover, Massachusetts, while excavated human remains were sent to the Peabody Museum at Harvard. In the early 20th century, no archaeologist consulted with Native American descendants concerning the excavation of their ancestors' homes and graves. Although Kidder was aware of the long-standing relationship between the abandoned Pecos Pueblo and the modern Pueblo of Jemez, he did not consider that any local population had a claim on artifacts and remains.

By a 1936 Act of Congress, the Pueblo of Jemez became the legal and administrative representative of the Pueblo of Pecos, which had been privately owned during Kidder's excavation. As a consequence of The Native American Graves Protection and Repatriation Act (NAGPRA), which requires federal and other museum facilities to inventory, establish cultural affiliations, and publish in the Federal Register any and all Native American human remains and certain objects in their possession, the Pueblo of Jemez made a formal claim on behalf of the Pecos people. This repatriation was primarily due to the efforts of William J. Whatley, the Jemez Pueblo tribal archaeologist, who searched through museum records for these remains and artifacts for eight years. The human remains from Kidder's excavations were returned to the Jemez people in 1999 and ritually reburied at Pecos National Historic Park. Kidder is buried on a hillside not far away, close to Pecos Pueblo.

== Family life ==
Although her name rarely occurred on publications, Kidder's wife Madeleine worked as an archaeologist alongside her husband. Kidder's grandson, T.R. Kidder is a noted archaeologist of the southeastern United States.

== Publications ==
- Kidder, A. V. (2000) [1924]. Introduction to the Study of Southwestern Archaeology (Online book). Yale University Press. ISBN 978-0-300-08345-3. – regarded as the first comprehensive archaeological study of a New World area
- Kidder, A. V. & Amsden, Charles Avery (1931). 5 The Pottery of Pecos. Papers of the Southwestern expedition. Vol. I The dull-paint wares. Yale University Press / Oxford University Press.
- Kidder, A. V. (1936). 7 The Pottery of Pecos. Papers of the Southwestern expedition. Vol. II The glaze-paint, culinary, and other wares. Anna Osler Shepard The technology of Pecos pottery. Yale University Press / Oxford University Press.
- Kidder, A. V. (1932). 6 The Artifacts of Pecos. Papers of the Southwestern expedition. Yale University Press / Oxford University Press.
- Kidder, A. V. (1958). 6 Pecos, New Mexico: archaeological notes. Papers of the Robert S. Peabody Foundation for Archaeology. Phillips Academy.
- Kidder, Alfred V. (1918). Reprints from the Journal of the Archaeological Institute of America and other papers. Vol. i Explorations in southwestern Utah in 1908 ii Notes on the pottery of Pecos iii Pottery of the Pajarito plateau and of some adjacent regions of New Mexico iv Prehistoric cultures of the San Juan drainage. Archaeological Institute of America.
- Kidder, Alfred V.; Jennings, Jesse D. & Shook, Edwin M. (1946). Excavations at Kaminaljuyu, Guatemala. with technological notes by Anna Osler Shepard. Carnegie Institution of Washington.
