= M. Wells Jakeman =

American archaeologist

Max Wells Jakeman (1910 – July 22, 1998) was the founder of the department of archaeology at Brigham Young University (BYU) and an early member of the advisory board of the New World Archaeology Foundation (NWAF). Jakeman has been described as "the father of Book of Mormon archaeology".

Jakeman received his Ph.D. from the University of California, Berkeley where he wrote his doctoral dissertation based on a combination of archaeological evidence and Spanish documents relating to the history of the Yucatan. Jakeman believed that archaeology must be grounded in a firm understanding of documents, and he did not see archaeology as a sub-discipline of anthropology.

In 1946 Jakeman joined the faculty of BYU where he worked to teach archaeology in the framework of "historical archaeology," that is, archaeology based on a close connection with historical documents. Jakeman was also closely connected with the Society for Early Historic Archaeology of which he served for a time as the director.

Jakeman was also the author of The Origin and History of the Mayans: Vol. 1

Jakeman was a member of the Church of Jesus Christ of Latter-day Saints and a believer in the historicity of the Book of Mormon.

== See also ==
- John L. Sorenson
- Thomas Stuart Ferguson

== Sources ==
- Max Wells Jakeman IZAPA STELA 5: A Major Archaeological Discovery of the New World
- Daniel C. Peterson and Matthew Roper. "Ein Heldenleben? On Thomas Stuart Ferguson as an Elias for Cultural Mormons" in FARMS Review Vol. 16, Issue 1.
- Stewart W. Brewer. "The History of an Idea: The Scene on Stela 5 from Izapa, Mexico, as a Representation of Lehi's Vision of the Tree of Life", Journal of Book of Mormon Studies. Vol. 8, issue 1
- "Memorial: Max Wells Jakeman: 1910-1998". Journal of Book of Mormon Studies Vol. 7, Issue 1
- article on Mormonism and the Book of Mormon that mentions Jakeman's studies
