= Pecos Conference =

Annual conference of archaeologists

The Pecos Conference is an annual conference of archaeologists held outdoors in August in the southwestern United States or northern Mexico. First organized as the Southwestern Archaeology Conference in 1927, it was renamed the Pecos Conference in 1950.

Each August, archaeologists set up a large tent for shade, and then spend three or more days together discussing recent research and the problems of the field and challenges of the profession. In recent years, Native Americans, avocational archaeologists, the general public and media organizations have come to speak with the archaeologists. These individuals and groups play an increasingly important role, as participants and as audience, helping professional archaeologists celebrate archaeological research and to mark cultural continuity.

First inspired and organized by A.V. Kidder at Pecos, New Mexico, in 1927, the Pecos Conference had no formal organization or permanent leadership until 2016. That year the conference joined Southwestern Archaeology Inc. and became a 501.c.3 nonprofit. Until then, professional archaeologists still found ways to organize themselves to meet at a new conference location each summer, mostly because they understand the problems of working in isolation in the field and the importance of face time with colleagues. To make progress with objective science and with other cultural matters, books and journal articles are important, but one still must look colleagues in the eye and work out the details of one's research in cooperative and contentious forums.

Open to all, the Pecos Conference remains an important opportunity for student archaeologists and avocational students of prehistory to meet with professional archaeologists on a one-on-one informal basis to learn about the profession, gain access to resources and new research opportunities, and to test new methods and theories related to archaeology. The conference features two days of papers, panels and discussion groups, as well as poster presentations, book sales and souvenirs. The Cordell-Powers Prize competition rewards young archaeologists, based on the quality of their presentations at the conference. A third day is devoted to tours of important archaeological sites, led by archaeologists who are working at that location or are highly knowledgeable about the area.
