= Thomas Stuart Ferguson =

American lawyer and mormon researcher

Thomas Stuart Ferguson (May 21, 1915 – March 16, 1983) was an American lawyer, a Mormon and an amateur archaeologist who dedicated his life to finding archeological evidence of the Book of Mormon in Mesoamerica. He was instrumental in the foundation of the New World Archaeological Foundation. He initially believed that the history of Mesoamerican cultures provided support to the historicity of the Book of Mormon, but towards the end of his life came to the conclusion that the Book of Mormon was a work of fiction rather than a historical book.

== Early life ==
Ferguson was born in Pocatello, Idaho, and attended the University of California, Berkeley. He studied under M. Wells Jakeman and became interested in Mesoamerican history as it was believed at the time that it would prove the historicity of the Book of Mormon. However, he did not continue studies in history but obtained a political science degree in 1937 followed by a LL.B. in 1942.

Ferguson began to work on the idea that the Book of Mormon could be examined for evidence. The dominant theory within the Church of Jesus Christ of Latter-day Saints (LDS Church) at the time was that the Book of Mormon took place over the entire Western Hemisphere. Ferguson became convinced that the geography was limited to Central America. In 1946 he visited Mexico with J. Willard Marriott, saw a wheeled pottery toy at the Museo Nacional de Mexico and wrote a paper on The Wheel in Ancient America with implications of support to mentions of chariots in the Book of Mormon. Ferguson approached church apostles John A. Widtsoe and Ezra Taft Benson with his investigations and received encouraging support. In 1947 he wrote his first book, Cumorah—Where? arguing strongly for the Central American setting of the Book of Mormon. The LDS Church-owned Deseret Book would not sell his book, as Book of Mormon geography was considered too controversial.

In January 1948 Ferguson made his second trip to Mexico. On his return he showed film of his trip to Benson, and then to general authorities and their wives at the annual Lion House party, following up later with a request that the LDS Church intensify missionary work in Latin America, and fund archaeological expeditions to Mesoamerica and Peru.

In 1950 he published a book Ancient America and the Book of Mormon, presenting the first English translation of 17th-century historical account of Fernando de Alva Cortés Ixtlilxóchitl, highlighting similarities between the text and the Book of Mormon. The book was popular within the LDS Church, but was not well received by scholars, and even LDS Church leader J. Reuben Clark wrote Ferguson, "be most careful to see that these traditions of the Indians are not the result of the early teachings of the Catholic priests." In 1954 apostle Joseph Fielding Smith attacked the new "modernist theory" confining the Book of Mormon to a limited geography.

In February 1952 Ferguson published Great Message of Peace and Happiness, as a way to encourage non-members of the LDS Church to gain interest in the Book of Mormon as a historical record. Apostle LeGrand Richards wrote to Ferguson, "you are laying away many treasures in heaven in the efforts you are putting forth to establish in the minds of men the divinity of the Book of Mormon."

== New World Archaeological Foundation ==
In 1951 Ferguson reached out to leading archaeologist Alfred V. Kidder about doing archaeological work in Mesoamerica in order to prove the authenticity of the Book of Mormon. Kidder encouraged Ferguson but emphasized that he must distinguish between scientific findings, and religious interpretations in his work. Ferguson wrote, "let the evidence from the ground speak for itself and let the chips fall where they may." Kidder and Ferguson wrote a twelve page proposal to the general authorities of the LDS Church, seeking $150,000 in funding for archaeological investigations, but were rejected. Ferguson traveled throughout California, Utah, and Idaho raising $22,000.

In October 1952 Ferguson founded the New World Archaeological Foundation (NWAF) with himself as president, and Kidder as vice president, and included professional archaeologists with a wide variety of theories on Native American origin. Kidder wrote, "All shades of opinion are represented!" NWAF was the largest archeological project funded by a religious institution. Ferguson, along with master's student John L. Sorenson, spent the next several years traveling throughout Mesoamerica documenting a large number of artifacts and formative period sites.

In April 1953 Ferguson met with the First Presidency and other leaders of the LDS Church to ask for $15,000 for the current year and $120,000 for the next four years in funding for the NWAF. Church president David O. McKay replied, "Brother Ferguson, you are a hard man to stop." A week later the LDS Church agreed to donate $15,000 on the condition that no publicity be attached to the donation in any way or any time. Ferguson spent the remainder of the year in Tabasco and Chiapas, believing it to be the location of a Book of Mormon city Zarahemla. In August 1953 Ferguson asked for additional funding from the LDS Church but only received $1,000; he effectively shut down NWAF in 1954.

Stela 5 at Izapa, interpreted by some LDS Scholars to be the Tree of Life from 1 Nephi 8

In January 1955 Ferguson wrote to the First Presidency asking again for funding, "To confirm Book of Mormon history through archaeological discoveries is to confirm revelation to the modern world. ... I know, and I know it without doubt and without wavering, that we are standing at the doorway of a great Book of Mormon era." This time, the LDS Church donated $200,000 to fund NWAF for four seasons.

In 1958 Ferguson published One Fold and One Shepherd presenting his excavated evidence to the broader Latter Day Saint community. It included a Izapa Stela 5 which he argued represented the Book of Mormon prophet Lehi's dream. Replicas of this tree-of-life stone are subsequently found in many Latter-day Saint homes.

He wrote in 1958:

"One cannot fake over 3000 years ... of history and have the fake hold water under the scrutiny given the Book of Mormon. The Book of Mormon is either fake or fact. If fake, the cities described in it are non-existent. If fact—as we know it to be—the cities will be there. If the cities exist, and they do, they constitute tangible, physical, enduring, unimpeachable evidence that Joseph Smith was a true prophet of God and that Jesus Christ lives."

In June 1960 apostles Mark E. Peterson and Marion G. Romney, along with BYU officials Ernest L. Wilkinson and Joseph T. Bentley, visited NWAF operations in Mexico to determine if the LDS Church should continue to fund operations, and came away impressed. In January 1961 the LDS Church decided not only to continue funding, but to absorb NWAF. Apostle Howard W. Hunter became the chairman, and Ferguson's role was changed from president to secretary. Regarding his significantly reduced role in the organization, Ferguson told Hunter that he was "content to eat whatever piece of pie is thrown my way, however small or humble."

== Loss of faith ==
In November 1967, it was announced that the ancient Egyptian papyri owned by Joseph Smith had been discovered. The papyri had been used by Smith in what he said was a translation of the Book of Abraham. Ferguson wrote to Milton R. Hunter to ask if any non-Mormon had translated the papyri. Ferguson had a copy examined by Henry L. F. Lutz who identified the papyri as being part of the Book of the Dead. He then had Leonard H. Lesko examine it and he too identified it as the Egyptian Book of the Dead. This, along with the lack of archaeological evidence for the Book of Mormon after searching for two decades, led Ferguson to doubt the translation abilities of Joseph Smith. From 1970 until his death Ferguson no longer believed that the Book of Mormon was historical, or that archaeological evidence would ever be found.

Ferguson visited LDS Church apostle Hugh B. Brown, and reviewed the evidence of the Book of Abraham. According to Ferguson, Brown agreed with him that the Book of Abraham was not what the LDS Church said it was. Ronald Barney interviewed Ferguson and recounted:

After reviewing the evidence with Brother Brown he [Ferguson] said that Brother Brown agreed with him that it was not scripture. He did not say or infer [imply] that it was his evidence that convinced Brother Brown of this conclusion. But nevertheless, he did say that Hugh B. Brown did not believe the Book of Abraham was what the church said it was.

LDS Church critic Wesley P. Walters described Ferguson as a "closet doubter." Ferguson privately suggested that Joseph Smith had no ability whatsoever to translate Egyptian hieroglyphs. In December 1970 he visited Jerald and Sandra Tanner and they developed a friendship with him, and declared that he had spent 25 years trying to prove Mormonism in vain. The Tanners wrote that Ferguson, "after many years one of the most noted defenders of the Book of Mormon, was finally forced to conclude it was 'fictional.'"

Ferguson was private about his views, sharing them with close associates. Howard W. Hunter was aware of Ferguson's beliefs, but still chose to maintain him as secretary of NWAF. Ferguson chose to remain a member of the LDS Church, believing it to be a good organization even if it wasn't true. He privately expressed in a letter:

Belonging with my eyes wide open, is actually fun, less expensive than formerly, and no strain at all. I am now very selective in the meetings I attend, the functions I attend, the amounts I contribute, etc. etc., and I have a perfectly happy time. I never get up and bear testimony—but I don't mind listening to others who do. I am much more tolerant of other religions and other thinking and feel fine about things in general. You might give my suggestions a trial run—and if you find you have to burn all the bridges between yourselves and the Church, then go ahead and ask for excommunication. The day will probably come—but it is far off—when the leadership of the Church will change the excommunication rules and delete as grounds non-belief in the two books mentioned [the Book of Abraham and the Book of Mormon] and in Joseph Smith as a prophet, etc.—but if you wait for that day, you probably will have died. It is a long way off—tithing would drop too much for one thing.

When asked in 1976 if he still had faith, he responded, "I think the LDS Church is better than any other brand of organized religion and I have not lost faith in a very large segment of it."

Later in 1976, fifteen years removed from any archaeological involvement with the NWAF, referring to his own paper, Ferguson wrote a letter in which he stated:

"The real implication of the paper is that you can't set the Book-of-Mormon geography down anywhere—because it is fictional and will never meet the requirements of the dirt-archeology. I should say—what is in the ground will never conform to what is in the book."

In 1983, a couple months before his death, Ferguson went with Howard W. Hunter on his final trip to Mexico for NWAF. He died unexpectedly from a heart attack while playing tennis at the age of 67.

Ferguson had purportedly been working on a book-length manuscript that would "expose Joseph Smith as a fraud"; however, this final manuscript has never surfaced.

== Personal life ==
Ferguson married Ester Israelson in 1940 and they had five children. Both were active in the Church of Jesus Christ of Latter-day Saints and he enjoyed the company of other members after he had lost faith in Joseph Smith.

== See also ==
- M. Wells Jakeman
