= New World Archaeological Foundation =

Archaeological organization run by Brigham Young University

The New World Archaeological Foundation (NWAF) is an archaeological organization run by Brigham Young University. When founded it was the largest archeological project funded by a religious institution. It was founded by Thomas Stuart Ferguson who sought to show how the history of Mesoamerican cultures proved the historicity of the Book of Mormon. Ferguson however found evidence to the contrary and from 1961 he kept a low profile as a secretary to the foundation which then became associated with the Brigham Young University and renamed as the BYU-NWAF.

== History ==
The NWAF was organized in 1952 for the purpose of supporting archaeological research into pre-Columbian cultures of Mesoamerica. It was founded by Thomas Stuart Ferguson, Alfred V. Kidder and Harvard University professor Gordon Willey. It was initially incorporated in California as a private organization with Ferguson in charge of fund-raising. The first project by the NWAF was headed by Pedro Armillas with archaeological studies along the Grijalva River.

As early as 1953, the NWAF received funding from the Church of Jesus Christ of Latter-day Saints after Ferguson approached church leaders. LDS apostle John Widtsoe served on the board of directors. Ferguson had a passion for looking for archaeological evidences for the Book of Mormon and he reminded the church leadership that discovering Book of Mormon artifacts would assist in the church's missionary program.

NWAF has always remained an archaeological foundation that includes many people not members of the LDS church. Initially the only Latter-day Saint on the foundation's advisory committee of five was M. Wells Jakeman. It also included Kidder, Willey, Armillas and Gordon F. Eckholm.

The NWAF became part of BYU in 1961 and Ferguson was removed from the director position and Howard W. Hunter was put in his place. Hunter was affiliated with NWAF for the next 24 years.

The original purpose of the foundation was described as:

The purpose of the Foundation is to carry on explorations and excavations to add to knowledge of Mesoamerican archaeology and to test the several theories as to the origin of the high civilizations of the Americas: 1) That they were autochthonous; 2) That, as set forth in the Book of Mormon, they were derived from ancient Israel; 3) That their rise was due to stimuli from some Asiatic source.

Mr. Ferguson is an advocate of the second of these theories; Dr. Ekholm... views with some favor the third; I feel that, although the problem is still unsolved, these civilizations were essentially the product of native American Indian creativeness. So all shades of opinion are represented!

The foundation has since been heavily involved with archaeological studies at such locations as Izapa, San Isidro, El Mirador, Paso de la Amada, and most recently again at Chiapa de Corzo.

As of 2009 the NWAF was directed by Donald W. Forsyth, Professor of Anthropology at Brigham Young University. He succeeded John E. Clark who was the director for many years.
