= Chiapa de Corzo (Mesoamerican site) =

Archaeological site in Mexico

Coordinates: 16°42′10.02″N 93°00′14.43″W

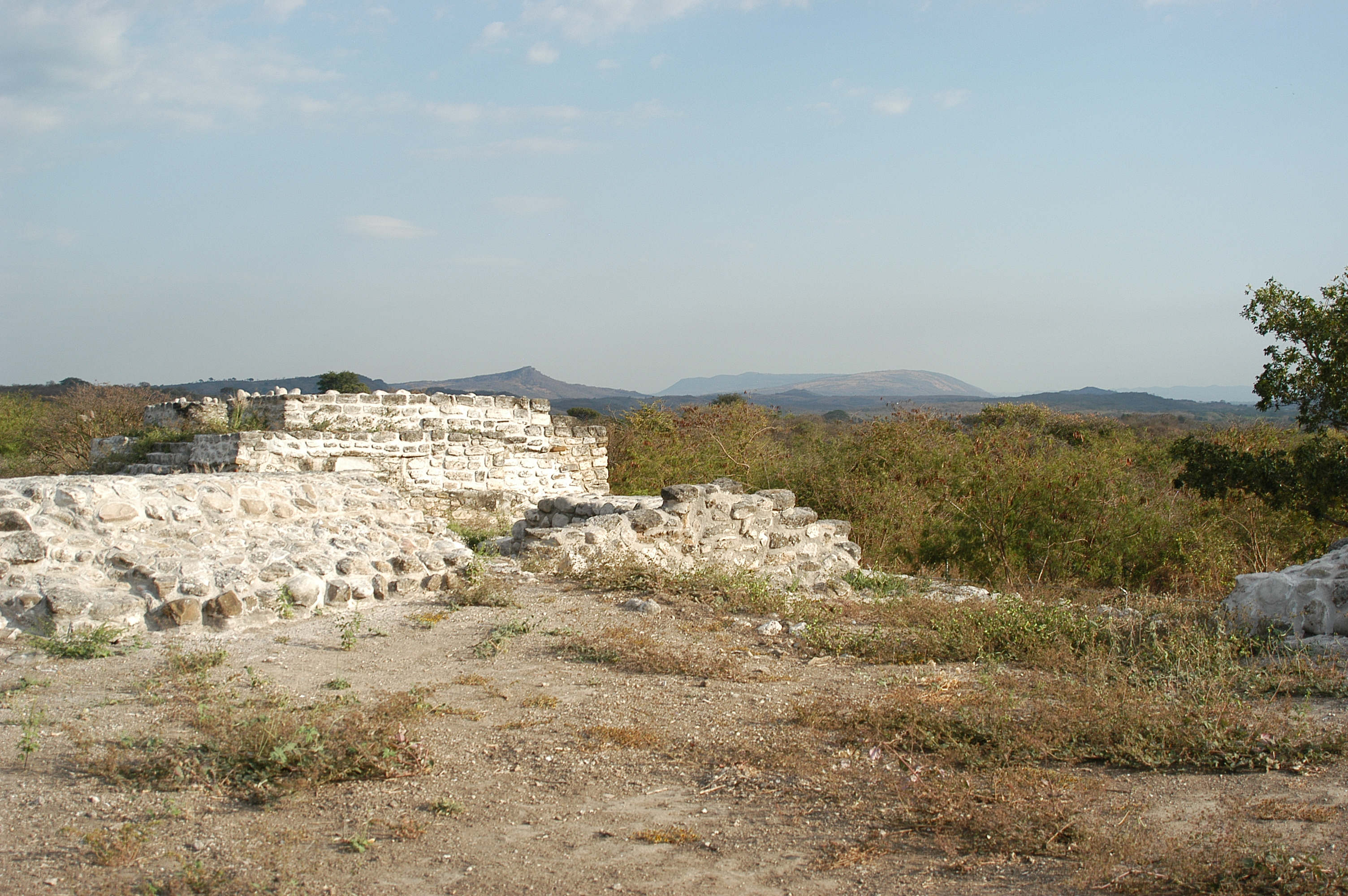
Mound 1, Chiapa de Corzo, looking south toward the Grijalva River

Chiapa de Corzo is an archaeological site of pre-Columbian Mesoamerica located near the small town of Chiapa de Corzo, Chiapas.

It rose to prominence around 700–500 BCE, during the Middle Formative period, becoming a regional center. By then, its public precinct had reached 18–20 ha in size, with total settlement approaching 70 ha. Because of its position near the Grijalva River in the Central Depression of Chiapas, it controlled the local trade routes to the Soconusco region, and other centers in the area such as Mirador (not to be confused with El Mirador), Santa Rosa, Ocozocoautla, and La Libertad.

The modern township of Chiapa de Corzo, Chiapas, founded in Colonial times and after which the site was named, is nearby.

== Site history ==
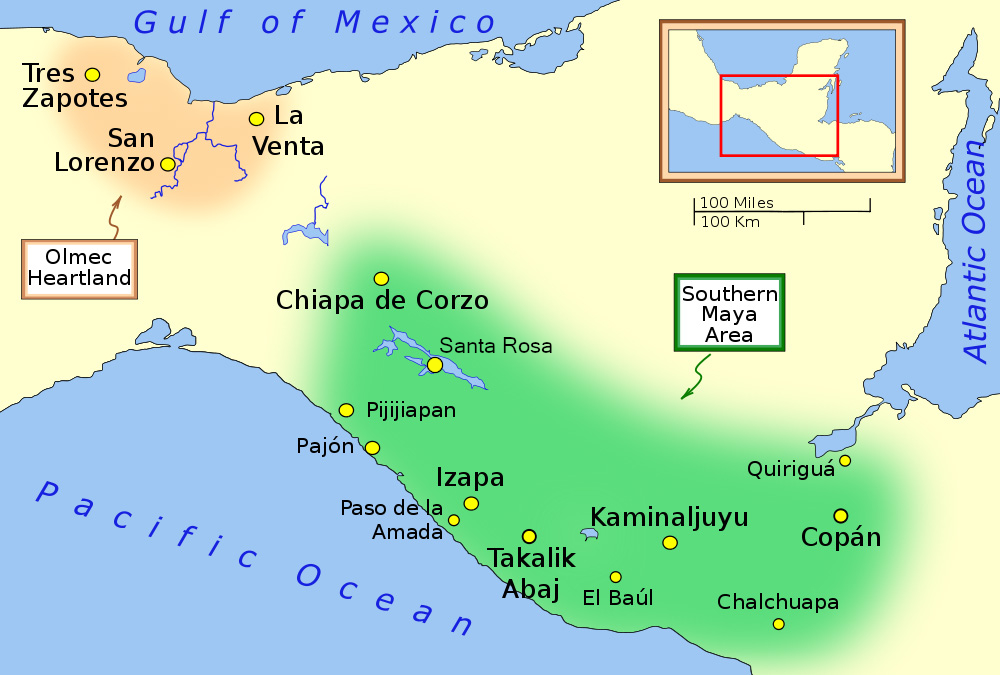
Map of Olmec and Mayan sites showing Chiapa de Corzo

The site shows evidence of continual occupation since the Early Formative period (c. 1200 BCE).

The mounds and plazas at the site, however, date to approximately 700 BCE with temples and palaces constructed at the end of the Late Formative or Protoclassic period, between 100 BCE and 200 CE.

In 2008, archaeologists discovered a massive Middle Formative Olmec axe deposit at the base of Chiapa de Corzo's Mound 11 pyramid. This deposit dates to around 700 BCE and is the second one of its kind found in Chiapas after nearby San Isidro. It is associated with one of the earliest E-Group astronomical complexes in Mesoamerica.

In April 2010, archaeologists discovered the 2,700-year-old tomb of a dignitary within Mound 11 that is the oldest pyramidal tomb yet discovered in Mesoamerica.

According to archaeologist Bruce Bachand, the tomb exhibits Olmec rather than Maya affinities. This tomb predates by 600 years any other such tomb found in Mesoamerica, such as those at Tikal, and at Kaminaljuyu.

== Cultural affiliation ==
The site is believed to have been settled by Mixe–Zoquean speakers, bearers of the Olmec culture that populated the Gulf and Pacific Coasts of southern Mexico.

Chiapa de Corzo and a half dozen other western Depression centers appear to have coalesced into a distinct Zoque civilization by 700 BCE, an archaeological culture that became the conduit between late Gulf Olmec society and the early Maya. Certain Mesoamerican traits such as planned cities, earthen pyramids, E-Group commemorative complexes, cloudy-resist waxy pottery, incensarios, and early logographic writing may have originated in the Zoque region.

== Regional centre ==
Starting around 100 BCE, during its Guanacaste phase, Chiapa de Corzo played the role of the regional capital. The city was linked with other areas across the Maya Lowlands, Maya Highlands, Pacific Coast, and Oaxaca. This is the time when the first hieroglyphic writing appeared on flat stamps, pottery vessels, stelae, and building panels.

Maya pottery types began to be included in elite burials, although utilitarian ceramics retained traditional patterns. This has suggested to some researchers, that the Maya culture to the east exerted influence or even control over Chiapa de Corzo, although there seems to be a waning of that Maya influence in the first centuries CE. It was during this time that the ancient platform mounds were covered with limestone and stucco.

== Decline ==
Significant changes occurred in the area during the Istmo phase (300–400 CE). There was an economic decline, as craft activity diminished and long-distance ties contracted. Chiapa de Corzo and a number of western Depression sites were abandoned by the Late Classic period, a population change that closely coincides with the invasion of a war like group of Manguean-speaking people known as the Chiapanec. The Chiapanec chose to occupy the adjacent floodplain of the Grijalva River where the modern town is now located, and they left the Zoque ruin on the nearby plateau untouched. The abandoned city then became a place of pilgrimage.

== Modern developments ==
The site has been heavily encroached upon over the last 70 years with the construction of roads, homes, businesses, utility systems, and a cemetery. The Nestlé company constructed a large milk processing plant in the center of the ruin in the late 1960s, removing Mound 17, one of the major ceremonial mounds at the site. In recent years, the Instituto Nacional de Antropología e Historia (INAH) has purchased sections of the site from local land owners. INAH officially opened a small portion of the ruin to tourists on December 8, 2009. The site is currently under investigation by a collaborative team of researchers from Brigham Young University, INAH-Chiapas, and Mexico's UNAM (see http://chiapadecorzo.byu.edu/).

== Notable finds ==
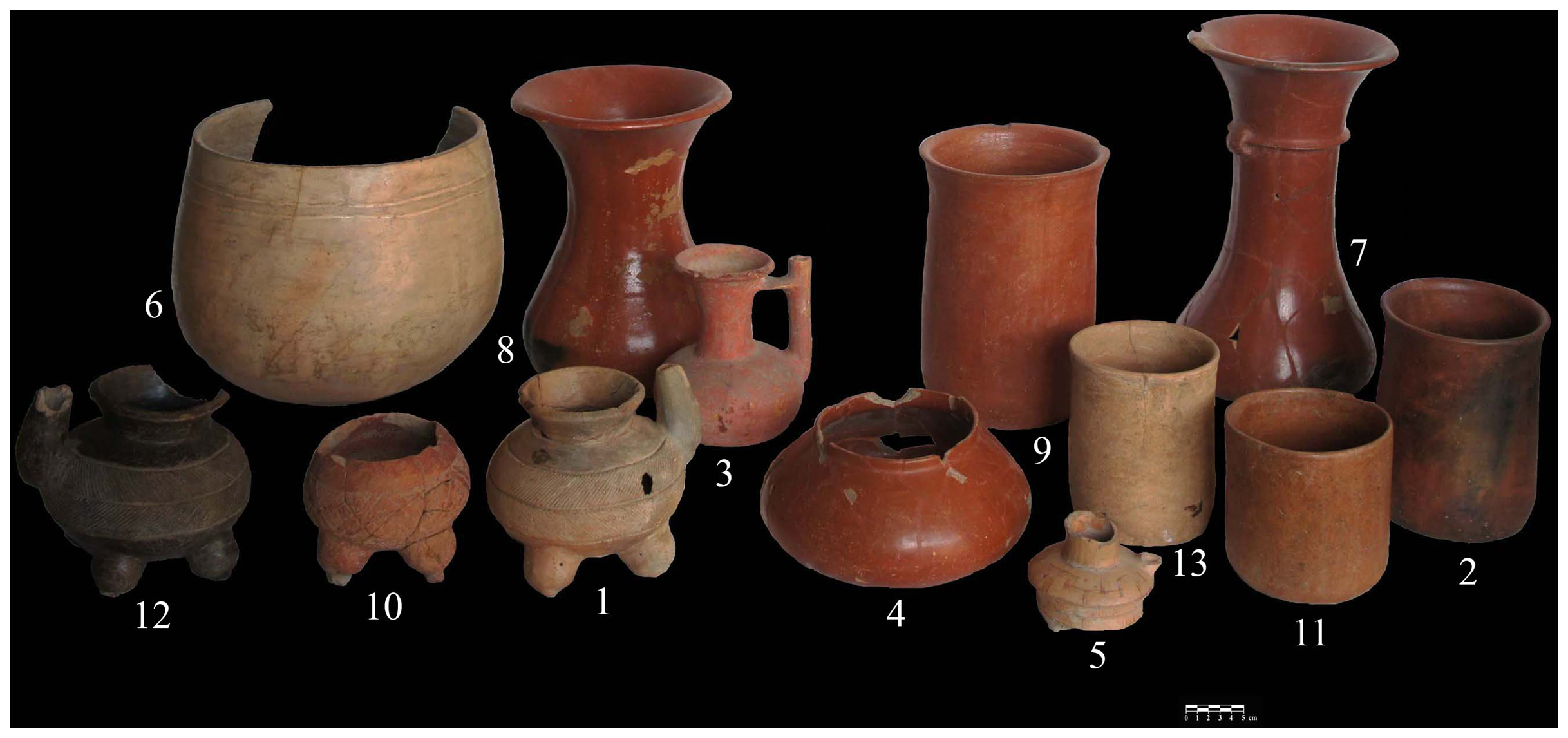
Pottery from the site

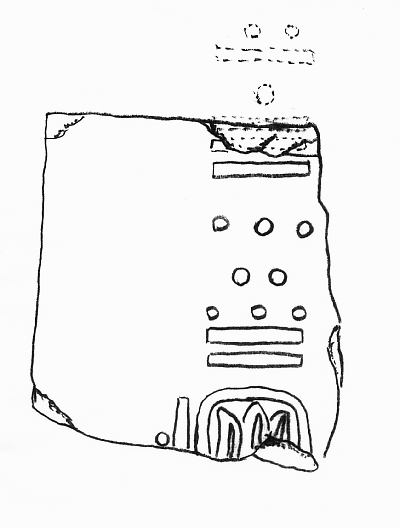
Stela 2, showing the date of 7.16.3.2.13, or December 36 BCE, the earliest Mesoamerican Long Count calendar date yet found

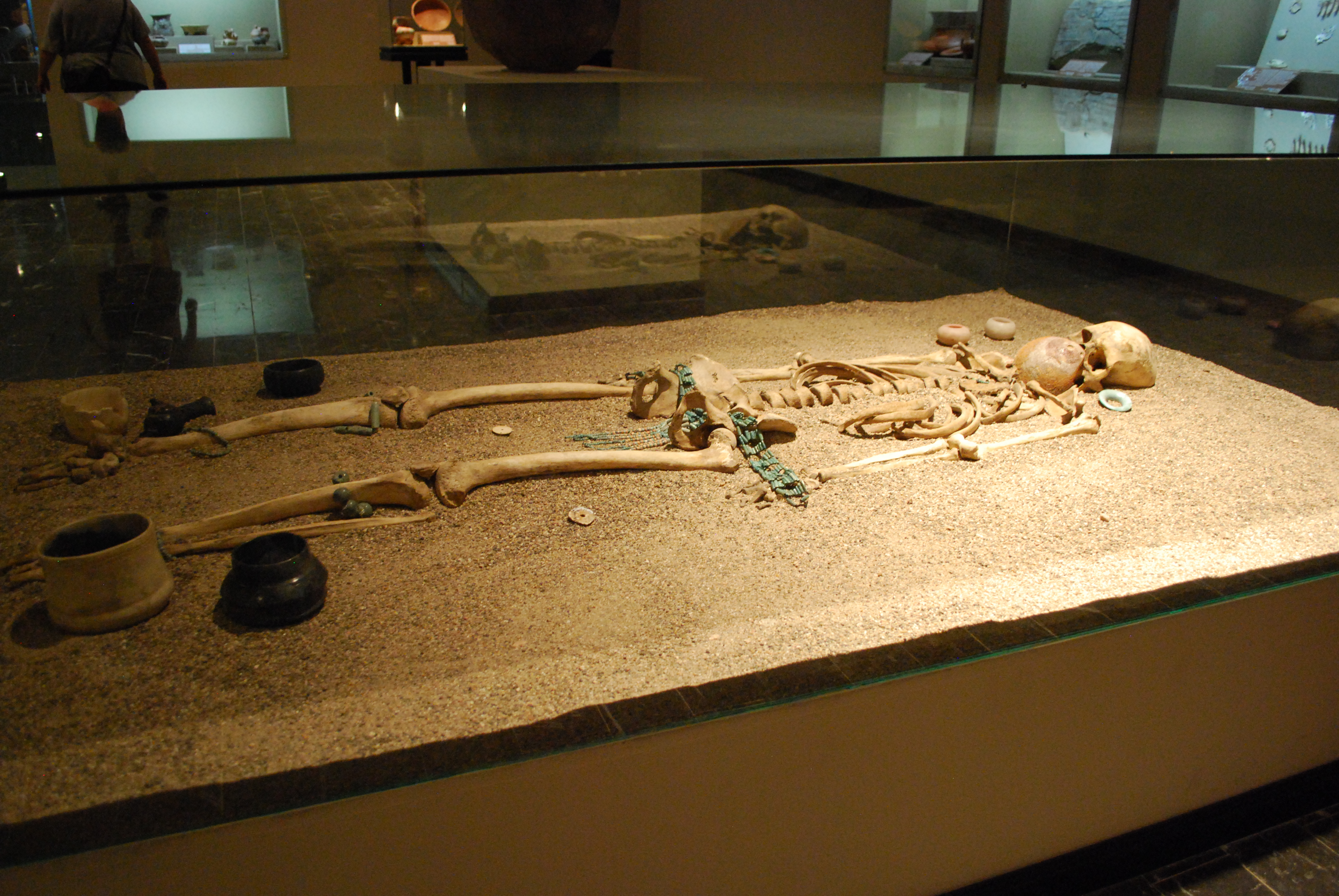
Skeleton from Mound 5 on display at the Regional Museum of Anthropology and History of Chiapas

The oldest Mesoamerican Long Count calendar date yet discovered, December 36 BCE, was found on Stela 2 (which is not a stela at all, but rather a misnamed, inscribed wall panel). All that survives of the original text is the day-name and the digits 7.16.3.2.13.

Chiapa de Corzo is also notable for a pottery sherd containing what is likely Epi-Olmec script. Dated to as early as 300 BCE, this sherd would be the oldest instance of that writing system yet discovered.

The site possesses possibly the earliest example of a Mesoamerican palace complex in Mound 5. This palace was constructed in the first century CE and ritually destroyed a couple centuries later.

More than 250 Formative period burials have been scientifically excavated at Chiapa de Corzo. Many derive from a unique Late Formative burial ground below the Mound 1 plaza. Chiapa de Corzo has the largest and perhaps the best chronologically subdivided Formative period burial sample in southern Mesoamerica.

Chiapa de Corzo has more clay cylinder seals and flat stamps than any other Formative Mesoamerican site, save Tlatilco. Hieroglyphs appear on examples made around 100 BCE.
