= Pedro Armillas =

Spanish Mesoamericanist (1914–1984)

Pedro Armillas Garcia (9 September 1914 – 11 April 1984) was a Spanish academic anthropologist, archaeologist, and an influential pre-Columbian Mesoamerica scholar of the mid-20th century. As an archaeologist he was known both for his fieldwork and excavations at numerous sites in central and northern Mexico, and his contributions in archaeological theory. His study of how Mesoamerican agriculture and subsistence modes of production influenced the development of Mesoamerican cultures was a pioneering one, and he was one of the earliest to investigate pre-Columbian irrigation and hydraulic systems.

== Biography ==
Armillas was born on 9 September 1914 in San Sebastián, Spain. In 1932 he received a bachelor's degree from the Instituto Balmes in Barcelona. With the outbreak of the Spanish Civil War he joined the Loyalist forces but upon their defeat left Spain for Mexico, with his wife the painter Angeles Gil Sala whom he married in 1937.

In Mexico he was a land surveyor and associated with the Tzeltal people. Between 1940 and 1946, Armillas studied in the recently inaugurated National School of Anthropology, known today as the National School of Anthropology and History, where he became a professor.

In the 1940s Armillas conducted several seasons of excavations at the major site of Teotihuacan in the Valley of Mexico, following on from earlier investigations by George Vaillant, Eduardo Noguera, and Sigvald Linné. His accomplishments in the Viking Group at Teotihuacan and in Oztuma, Guerrero, deserve particular mention. He also worked for the New World Archaeological Foundation in 1952–1953.

From the 1960s on he taught at various universities in the United States including the University of Illinois at Chicago where he was a professor of anthropology. He died in Chicago on 11 April 1984.
