= List of pageants of the Church of Jesus Christ of Latter-day Saints =

This list of pageants of the Church of Jesus Christ of Latter-day Saints delineates those annual outdoor theatrical performances produced by members of the Church of Jesus Christ of Latter-day Saints (LDS Church). It is reminiscent of early Christian Pageants which reenacted the world history in processional performance. Latter-day Saint pageants are held outdoors, they are free to the public, and typically last for a two-week period. In December 2018, the LDS Church announced that four pageants will phased out over the next several years.

== Pageants in production ==
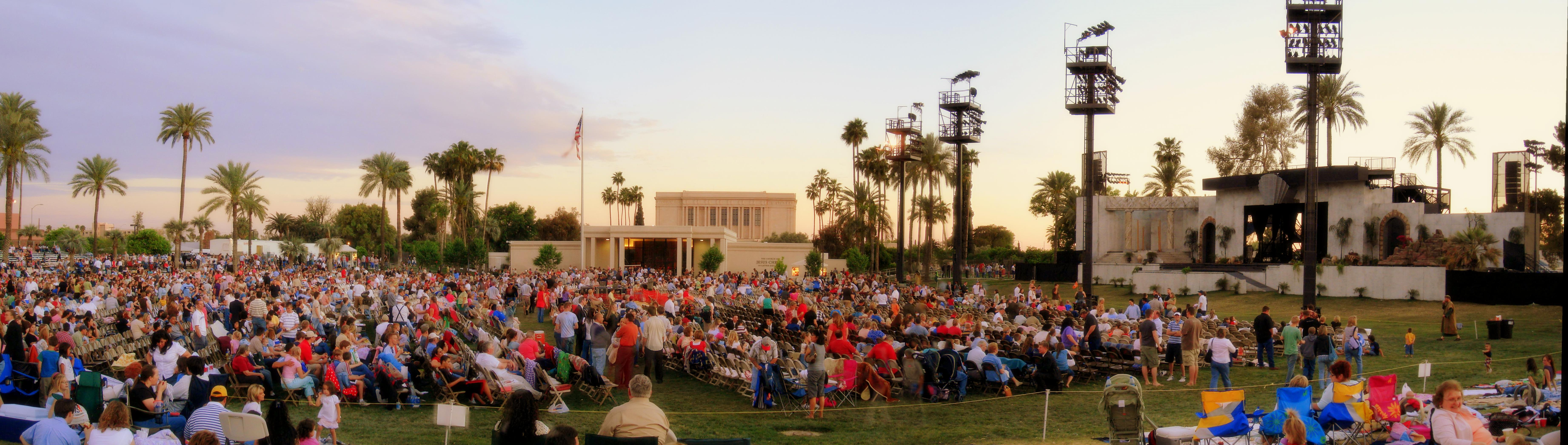
The audience prior to a 2007 performance of the Mesa Arizona Easter Pageant

- Mesa Easter Pageant: Jesus the Christ, Mesa, Arizona: This free musical is presented during the two weeks before Easter on the north lawn of the Mesa Arizona Temple.
- The British Pageant: Truth Will Prevail (Chorley, Lancashire, England): Will generally be held every four years. The most recent pageant took place in August 2023. The next performance is scheduled for 2027 in England.
- The Nauvoo and British Pageants: Since the British Pageant is not an annual pageant in England, it was determined that a modified version of the British Pageant would be brought to Nauvoo in 2014 and be performed on alternating evenings during the pageant season. The Nauvoo Pageant is designed to emphasize the prophetic mission of Joseph Smith and honors the Saints who built this city and temple. The next series of pageants will be held July through August 2024.

== Discontinued productions ==
- And it Came to Pass: An informal, indoor pageant near the Oakland California Temple (ended in 2007)
- Castle Valley Pageant, Castle Dale, Utah, (1978–2018)
- Clarkston Pageant, Clarkston, Utah, (1983–2017)
- Hill Cumorah Pageant, Palmyra, New York, (1937–2019)
- LDS Visitor Center in Independence, Missouri, various pageants (1975–1996)
- Mormon Miracle Pageant, Manti, Utah, (1967–2019)
- People of the Book, Burbank, California, (1967)

== See also ==
- Christian drama
- Easter Drama
- Jesuit drama
- Liturgical drama
- Morality play
- Mystery play
- Mormon literature
- Passion play
- Savior of the World
