= Mesa Arizona Easter Pageant =

Annual LDS Church event

Jesus the Christ
- Written by: The Church of Jesus Christ of Latter-day Saints
- Subject: Creation of the world, Fall of Adam and Eve, and life of Jesus Christ
- Genre: Religion
- Setting: Evenings on the North lawn of the LDS Temple visitors' center in Mesa, Arizona, United States

Premiere
- Date: 1928
- Official website

The Mesa Arizona Easter Pageant (Mesa Pageant) is an annual production of the Church of Jesus Christ of Latter-day Saints (LDS Church) entitled Jesus the Christ and staged on the grounds of the Mesa Arizona Temple. This Latter-day Saint pageant is now the largest annual outdoor Easter pageant in the world.

With a 450-member cast, the 65-minute pageant depicts the birth, life, death, and resurrection of Jesus Christ using song and dance.

== History ==
As documented in the book The Mesa Easter Pageant: 80 years of sharing the story of Jesus the Christ, the practice of holding an annual Easter celebration at the Mesa Arizona Temple grounds began in 1938. Previously, from 1928 through 1937, the Mutual Improvement Association (ages 17–24) of the LDS Church held an Easter sunrise service at the Teachers College in Tempe (later to become Arizona State University); and, in 1930, the Arizona Republic reported that an Easter service would be presented by the church's Second Ward choir on the lawn of the temple. Still, it was the sunrise service in 1938 that marked the beginning of an Easter celebration being hosted on the temple grounds every year for eight decades, except 1975 and 2019 through 2021, when the temple was closed for remodeling.

Irwin Phelps, a local community college teacher and member took over control of the pageant in 1977, transitioning it into an evening event and writing a script for a play. His wife, Eileen Stonely Phelps, became the costume director, sewing dozens of costumes in her home each year. Each year, the even grew in size and grandeur, adding theatrical elements and staging, music, dance, and a cast of nearly 500--to earn the reputation of being the largest annual outdoor Easter pageant in the world.

In 2018, the Mesa Pageant celebrated its 80th anniversary with 90,000 attendees.

== Production ==
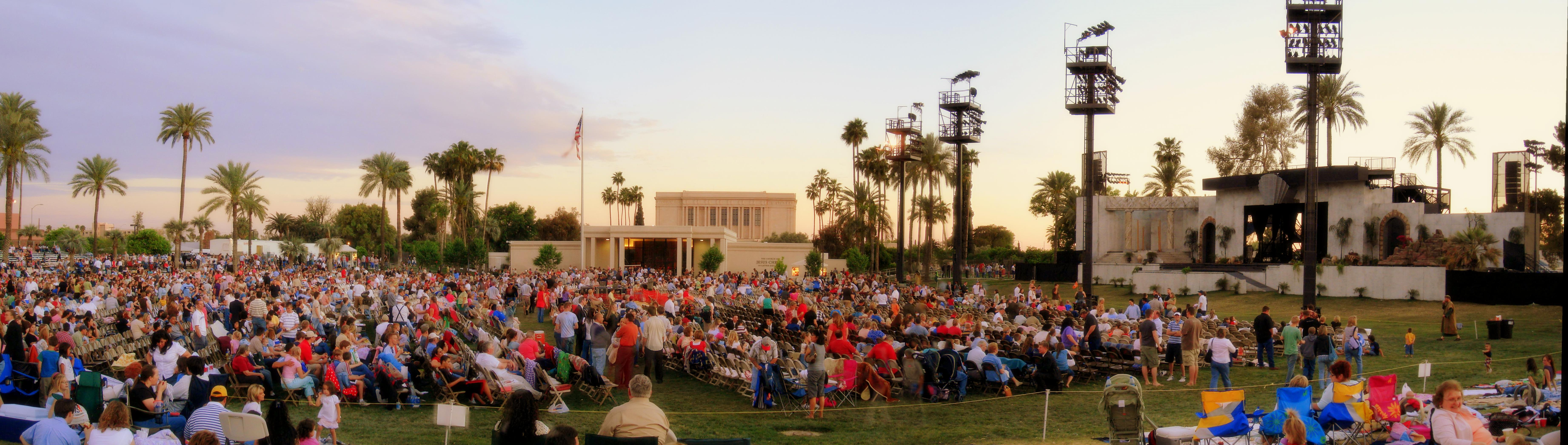
A crowd gathering to watch the pageant in 2007, the stage to the right and the temple in the background

The Mesa Pageant runs Tuesday through Saturday evenings during the two weeks just before Easter, with translations done in Spanish with 400 headphones. The four-story, multi-level stage used for the pageant is a temporary installment on the temple grounds. It takes three weeks to assemble and is disassembled after each Easter season.

Auditions are required to participate in the Mesa Pageant, and all cast and crew positions are voluntary. Nearly 1,000 people auditioned in 2013 while only 475 (the largest cast to date) were invited back. While the cast is mostly composed of LDS Church members, those of several other religious faiths participate in the production each year.

Participation in the Mesa Pageant is meant to enrich both the viewer and the cast and crew. Before each performance, the cast and crew gather in the chapel adjacent to the temple grounds for a devotional. A portion of the cast and crew is also assigned to visit with the crowd before and after the production each night. The director as of November 2013 was Jenee Prince.

== See also ==
- Christian drama
- Easter Drama
- Passion play
