= Pasku =

Pasku Sinhala essy is a Roman Catholic Passion Play which originated in the Catholic areas of Jaffna in northern Sri Lanka in the late 19th century. Soon after, it was performed in the Sinhalese speaking Catholic regions of the western coastal region as well. The play began in Passion week and lasted for the entire Holy Week. In some congregation, the actors are replaced by life-size statues depicting the central characters in the episodes of Christ's death and resurrection. The statues move and create stage pictures above and behind six-foot high temporary walls. Painted scenes ascend to nearly twenty feet behind the figures. a reciter stands between the audience seated on the ground and the statues. Interpreting each scene of the well known biblical stories. In some locales actors wear historical costumes of the period. Whether statues or live actors are used. Performances in corporate Christian church music and some times western musical instruments, such as the organ.

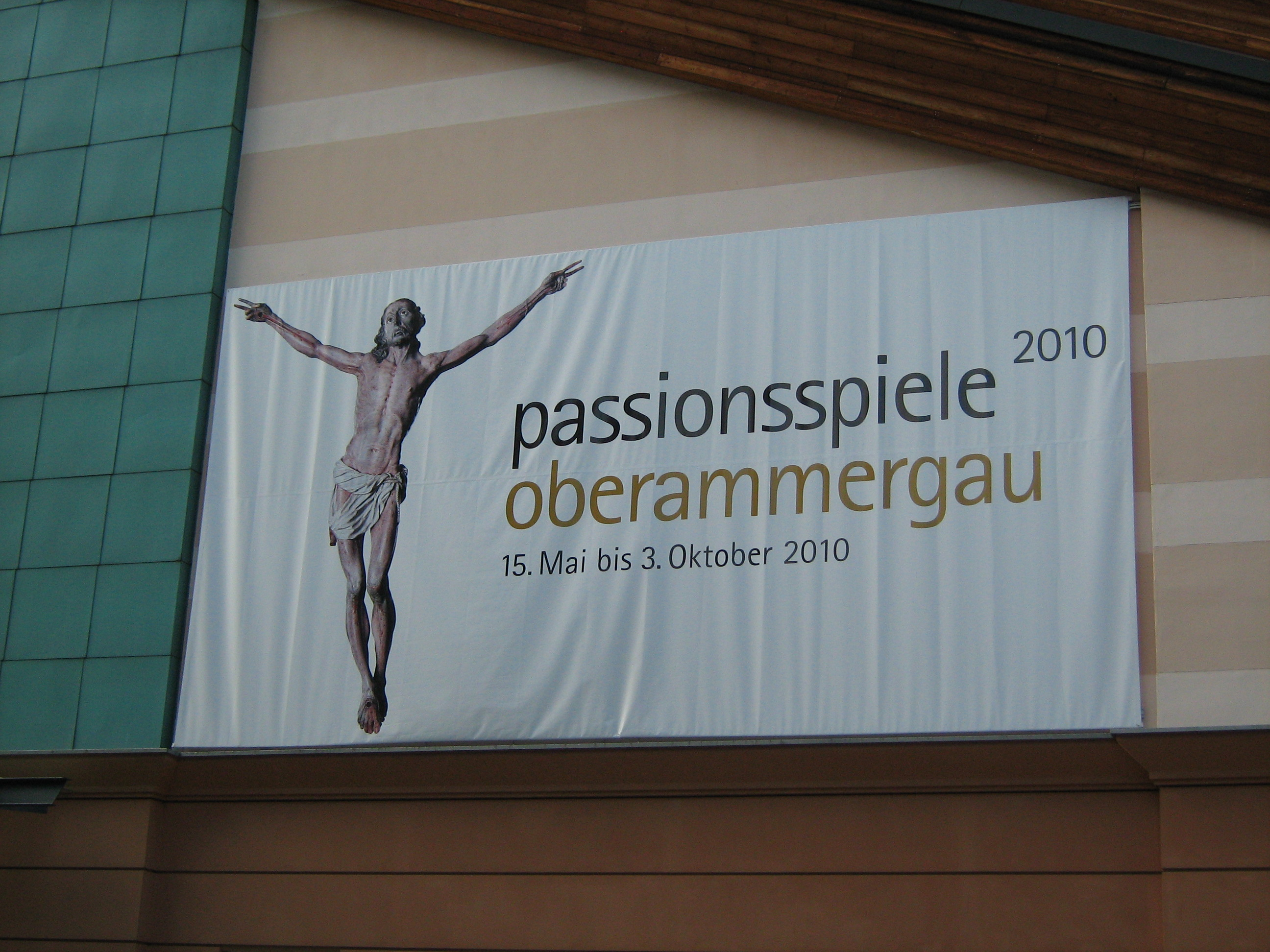
Poster outside the Passion Play Theater in Oberammergau

Several notable plays were written and produced by K. Lawrence Perera of Boralessa whose ambitions was to imitate the famous Oberammergau Passion Play in 1923 which drew together unschooled actors from among virtually every humble profession of the area. Over a hundred performers participated to create the epic. The stage consisted of five sections arranged like RUKADA puppet theatre with a central acting area and side wings stretching out to the right and left.

A sensation occurred in 1939 when it was announced that all the female roles would be played by women. The Archbishop of Colombo banned the performance on the grounds that women acting on the same stage as men would have violated the decorum of the country. Although they were not pleased, the actors gave in to church pressure and used only men.

== The Passion Play ==
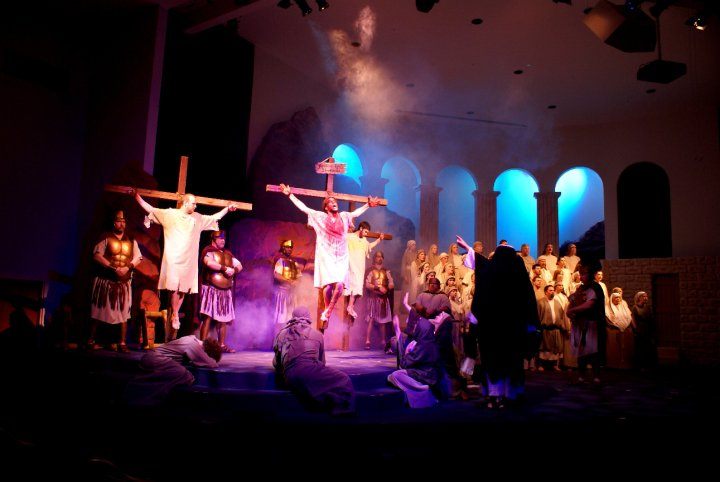
Crucifixion scene during the 2010 production of the Passion Play The Promise: The Power of His Love in Fond du Lac, WI.

The Passion Play also known as Easter pageant is a dramatic presentation depicting the Passion of Jesus Christ: his trial, suffering and death. It is a traditional part of Lent in several Christian denominations, particularly in Catholic tradition. Oberammergau Passion Play performed since 1634 as a tradition by the inhabitants of the village of Oberammergau, Bavaria, Germany.

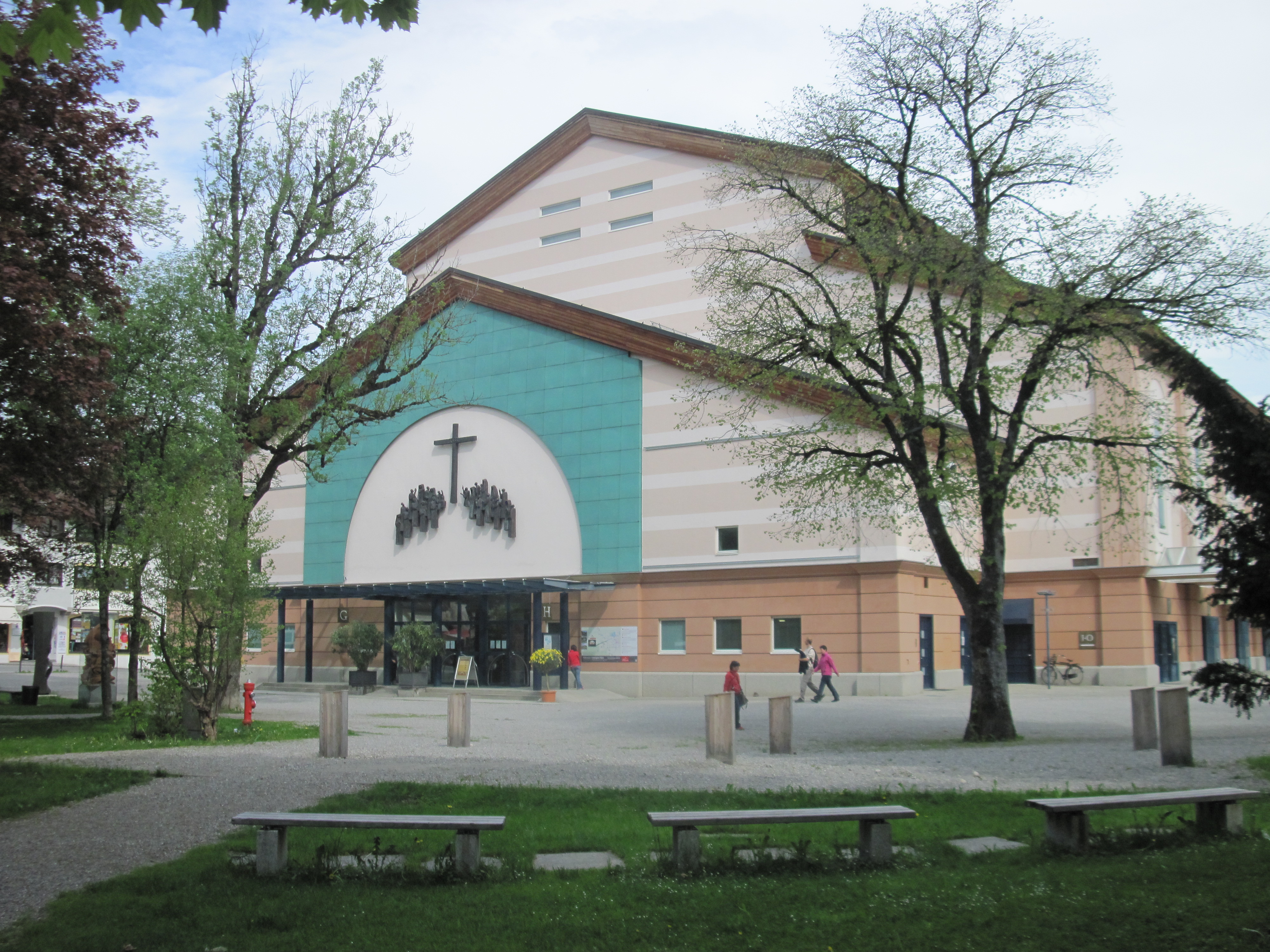
Oberammergau Theatre (2013)

== Passion Week ==
Passion Week is a name for the week beginning on Passion Sunday, as the Fifth Sunday of Lent was once called in the Roman Rite.

== Rukada ==
Rukada is a doll puppet theatre practised almost exclusively in the city of Ambalangoda on the South-western coast. three to Four feet high puppets are manipulated by strings. Performances are presented on an acting area divided into three sections.
