= Engelberg Codex =

The Engelberg Codex is a music manuscript from the Benedictine abbey of Engelberg, Canton of Obwalden, Switzerland. One of the most important late-medieval liturgical manuscripts from Switzerland, the codex was compiled over an extended period of time and by several different scribes, as can be assessed from variations in colours of ink, types of script, note shapes and rubrics. In many instances the copying of the text preceded that of the music, though some scribes would alternate between individual syllables or words and the corresponding phrases of music. The Engelberg Codex contains early examples of German sacred song, an Easter drama, tropes, sequences and motets.

A full facsimile edition was published in 1986 by Amadeus Verlag (Bernhard Päuler), Winterthur (Switzerland), for the Société Suisse de Musicologie.

A recording with 18 pieces from the codex entitled Engelberg 314 by the Schola Cantorum Basiliensis (SCB) was published in 1990 by Deutsche Harmonia Mundi (DHM), the label of Sony BMG predominantly devoted to preclassical music.
