= Biblical storytelling =

Biblical storytelling is a discipline in which the storyteller takes a passage from the Bible, studies and reflects on that passage, and then tells it in a way so that the hearers may best connect with the story as well.

== History ==
Biblical storytellers place themselves in line with the oral tradition of the Biblical time-period, understanding that the normal mode of engaging with the Bible during this time was through the public reading of scripture or in the retelling of stories. Modern Biblical storytelling as a discipline may be traced to Tom Boomershine, a longtime professor at United Theological Seminary in Dayton, Ohio who experimented with the idea of memorising stories in the Bible and performing them during his years in seminary. In 1977, he together with Gil Bartholomew (now Adam Bartholomew) then went to begin the Network of Biblical Storytellers (NBS). Biblical storytelling guilds began to form internationally, with one forming in Australia in 1990, one in Canada in 1996, and later ones in the United Kingdom and in Singapore. Boomershine was also the founder and former chair of the Bible in Ancient and Modern Media group in the Society of Biblical Literature, which researches the art and practice of Biblical storytelling in the ancient and modern world as well as how different media have been and continue to be used to disseminate Biblical material.

== Techniques ==
=== Internalization ===
The term memorization is rarely used when describing storytelling because it usually is taken to mean rote learning. Instead the process is described as 'internalization' or 'committing to deep memory'. As a result of this process the general expectation is that the storyteller will be able to tell the story with 95% content accuracy and 75% verbal accuracy. Techniques may be used as follows:

1. Making sure the script is easy to read
2. Breaking up the story into scenes
3. Identifying key words and phrases
4. Identifying locations
5. Investigating and understanding characters
6. Tracking the emotional journey
7. Understanding how the story functions in the wider context

=== Presentation ===
Presenting a story from the Bible borrows many techniques from acting, yet in many ways it is quite a distinct art form. Instead of solely taking on one character, the storyteller describes the entire scene in the imagination of the audience. Because storytelling is usually done without many props or sets, this requires the storyteller to visualise the scene of the story in order to describe it physically whilst telling the story. A number of techniques may be used:

1. Locations - Using consistent places in the space for locations and characters in the story.
2. Reacting - Acting as an emotional guide for the audience.
3. Gesturing - Pointing or gesturing to show the audience where objects are in the imaginary scene.
4. Miming - Interacting with things or characters to give them a tangible reality.
5. Acting Out - Demonstrating events or actions whilst talking about them.
6. Characterization - Using different tones of voice/accents or different stances to distinguish different characters and to give them depth and meaning.

== Types ==
=== Single person performances ===
Much of Biblical Storytelling is done as a single storyteller learning one story from the Bible and performing it:

- when the Bible passage would normally be read (e.g. in Church meeting)
- as a special drama for an occasion (the death and resurrection of Jesus for an Easter event)
- in a meeting of storytellers to share stories

=== Epic storytelling ===
At events where storytellers are gathering together, an Epic Storytelling may be set where different parts of the longer story are distributed to those coming together before the gathering and the epic story is told at the event with each of the storytellers telling their sections.

=== Ensemble storytelling ===
Ensemble Storytelling in Daniel - Dream Interpreter by The Backyard Bard

In a theatrical Biblical Storytelling performance with multiple storytellers, there may be only one speaking storyteller at a time, so the other storytellers may be used to enhance the telling in the following ways:

- by being non-verbal characters in the scene
- to be part of the set
- lines could be distributed or said in unison for dramatic effect
- by adding a soundscape (e.g. cheering, mourning, laughing or making sound effects)

== See also ==
- Bible story
- List of Bible stories
- Christian drama
- Oral tradition
