= Karl Young (theatre historian) =

American medievalist and theatre historian (1879–1943)

Karl Young (November 2, 1879 – November 17, 1943) was an American professor of English, medievalist, and theatre historian. Young's theory of the liturgical origins of dramatic performance gained wide acceptance in the later twentieth century.

== Life and career ==
Young was born in Clinton, Iowa; his father was lawyer and his grandfather a Presbyterian clergyman. He grew up in Ypsilanti, Michigan and graduated from high school there. He attended the University of Michigan as an undergraduate and went on to get a Master's Degree (1902) and doctorate (1907) at Harvard University. During his graduate studies, he taught at the Naval Academy in Annapolis for two years, then returned to Harvard to finish the doctorate. After taking his Ph.D. (The Chaucer Society published his dissertation on Troilus and Criseyde in 1908), he taught from 1908 to 1923 at the University of Wisconsin–Madison. The high point in his career were the two decades spent on the faculty at Yale University (1923–1943). In 1933, he became a member of the American Academy of Arts and Sciences. In 1940, he was elected President of the Modern Language Association; he received several honorary doctorates and prizes, among them the Gollancz Memorial Prize in 1941.

Young's research on what he called "liturgical drama" began with a publication in 1908; he relied heavily on Charles Magnin's notion that modern European theatre performance originated in the Catholic Mass, in the Quem quaeritis Trope. This thesis, also propagated and widely disseminated by Léon Gautier, was brought to an even wider and anglophone audience through Young's The Drama of the Medieval Church (1933), which was reprinted several times and often taught at universities. Later scholars criticized Young's model, claiming that it misunderstood the diverse and manifold liturgical culture of medieval Christianity, in which certain roles and tropes are legitimate elements of the liturgy and not necessarily self-conscious dramatic performance. Indeed, later generations re-examined notions of "performance" to such a degree, that Young's theses became difficult to propagate.

He died in New Haven, Connecticut; a collection of his personal notes and scholarly files (mostly concerning medieval liturgy) is a part of the holdings at Yale University Music Library.

== Selected books ==
- The Harrowing of Hell, Madison 1909.
- A Liturgical Play of Joseph and his Brethren, Baltimore 1911.
- The Origin of the Easter Play, Modern Language Association of America 1914.
- Officium pastorum : A Study of the Dramatic Developments within the Liturgy of Christmas, Madison 1914.
- The Drama of the Medieval Church, 2 volumes, Oxford 1933.

== Sources ==
- Wilmarth S. Lewis, et alia (including Karl Young’s widow), A Memoir of Karl Young (New Haven: privately printed, 1946).
- Michael Norton, Of ‘Stages’ and ‘Types’ in Visitatione Sepulchri, Comparative Drama (1987), pp. 34–61 and pp. 127–44., esp. pp. 127–31 (on Young’s 3 stages).
- Michael Norton, Liturgical Drama and the Reimagining of Medieval Theater (Kalamazoo, 2017), pp. 61–63.
- Oscar James Campbell, Karl Young, in College English 5.4 (1944), p. 222.
- Witter Bynner, Karl Young, in The Yale University Library Gazette 23.3 (1949), p. 145–147.
