= Christian drama =

Theatrical performances of Christian stories

Christian drama or Christian tragedy is based on Christian religious themes.

The Bible contains many drama sequences; the very Betrayal and arrest of Jesus in the new testament is a tragedy.

== Mystery play ==
Through the medieval period churches in Europe frequently performed mystery plays, retelling the stories of the Bible. They developed from the representation of Bible stories in churches with accompanying song. As these liturgical plays became more popular, more vernacular or everyday elements were introduced and non-clergy began to participate. As the dramas became increasingly secular, they began to be performed entirely in the vernacular and were moved out of the churches by the 13th or 14th century.

These religious performances were taken over by the guilds, with each guild taking responsibility for a particular piece of scriptural history. From the guild control they gained the name mystery play. The mystery play developed into a series of plays dealing with all the major events in the Christian calendar, from the Creation to the Day of Judgment. By the end of the 15th century, the tradition of acting these plays in cycles on festival days (such as the Feast of Corpus Christi) was established across Europe.

== Morality play ==
By the 15th and 16th century the form had developed into the morality play. These were allegories, in which the protagonists met personifications of various moral attributes, the net effect being the encouragement to live a virtuous life.

== Puritan age ==
In the sixteenth and seventeenth centuries, theatre was generally seen as wicked, and the church made attempts to suppress it. In the United States, condemnation of the theatre was widespread in the eighteenth century; in 1794, President Timothy Dwight IV of Yale College in his "Essay on the Stage" declared that "to indulge a taste for playgoing means nothing more or less than the loss of that most valuable treasure: the immortal soul."

== Modern ==
In the twentieth century churches, particularly evangelical churches, rediscovered the use of theatre as a form of outreach and as a valid art form.

In Britain in the early twentieth century, it was illegal for any human actor to portray a divine personage on stage, placing severe restrictions on Christian theatre. The groundbreaking 1941-1942 radio drama The Man Born to Be King shattered this taboo, by not only including Jesus as a character, but giving him 'ordinary' speech rather than 'biblical' language. (Radio portrayals were not covered by the law, but the piece drew huge complaints nonetheless.)

T. S. Eliot's play Murder in the Cathedral explored Christian themes of martyrdom and sacrifice, as well as church history.

In the 1970s, many plays were produced dealing with Christian subjects, notably Jesus Christ Superstar and Godspell. At approximately the same time, many churches were again turning to drama as a means of outreach, and as a valid art form. Small Christian theatre companies began to spring up in Britain and America. Covenant Players was founded in 1963 to produce Christian plays written by its founder.

== See also ==
- Biblical Storytelling
- Christian literature
- Easter Drama
- Jesuit drama
- Liturgical drama
- Passion play
- Theological fiction
