= Passion Play =

Dramatic presentation depicting the Passion of Jesus

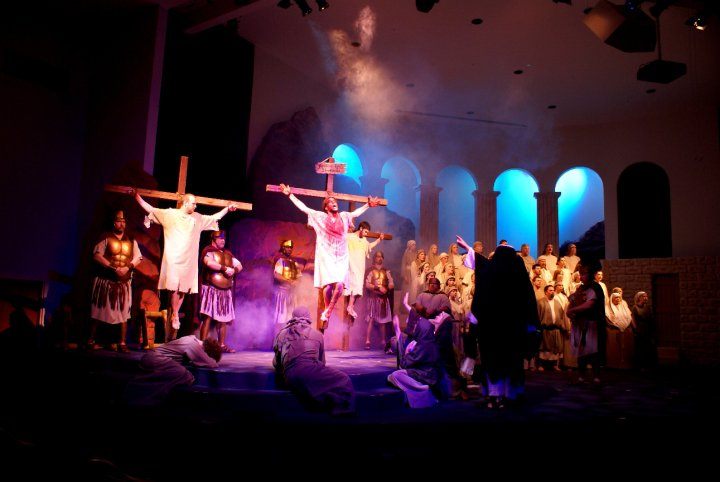
Crucifixion scene during a 2010 production of The Promise in Fond du Lac, Wisconsin

The Passion Play or Easter pageant is a dramatic presentation depicting the Passion of Jesus: his trial, suffering and death. The viewing of and participation in Passion Plays is a traditional part of Lent in several Christian denominations, particularly in the Catholic and Evangelical traditions; as such, Passion Plays are often ecumenical Christian productions.

Passion Plays have had a long and complex history involving faith and devotion, civic pageantry, religious and political censorship, large-scale revival and historical re-enactments. Many Passion Plays historically blamed the Jews collectively for the death of Jesus, with such plays leading to antisemitism and violence against Jews.

== Origin and history in Great Britain ==
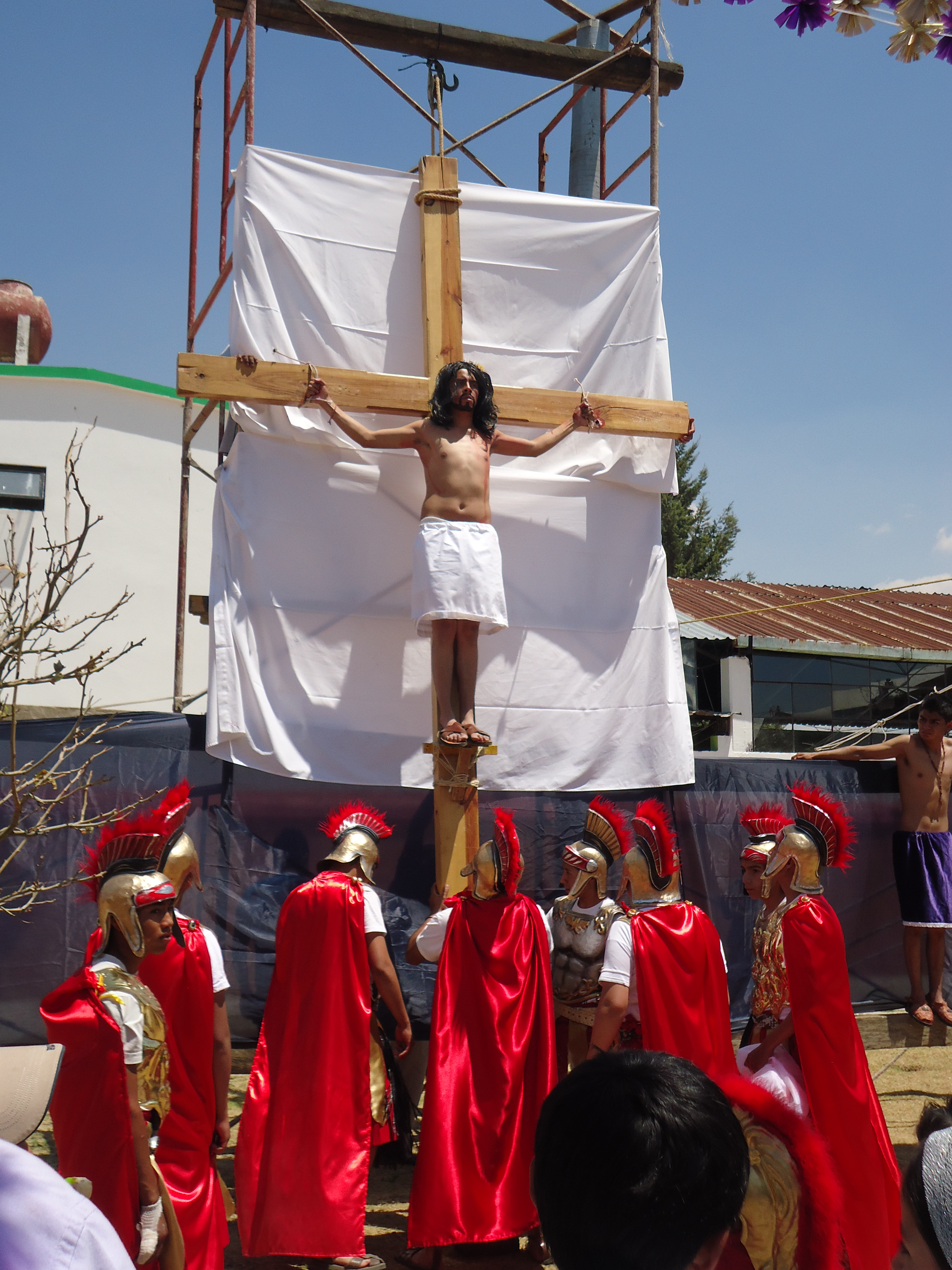
Reenactment of the crucifixion of Jesus in Texcoco, Mexico

The origin and development of Passion Plays in Great Britain can be traced back to one of the earliest pieces of theatre in Britain, which was the Quem Quaeritis: four lines spoken by two choirs addressing each other in a dramatic form. It can also be traced back to the liturgical drama used within the church and the Corpus Christi festivals which took place outside the church.

Passion Plays were the focal point of the Mystery Plays that were performed by city guilds in many medieval cities, the most prominent being York, Chester and Coventry. Public performances of Passion Plays lasted from the fourteenth century to the middle of the sixteenth century, with a few examples into the seventeenth century. Richard Davy composed one of the earliest settings of the Passion according to St Matthew.

During the Reformation, the Passion Plays and Mystery Cycles were suppressed due to their perceived Catholic influences. Eventually, in 1642 all theatre was banned with the suppression of the playhouses by a Puritan Parliament. With the Restoration, theatres opened again in 1660, this time with women permitted to perform on the stage. However, religion and politics were heavily censored for the next few hundred years in England and no Passion Play was performed publicly during this time.

The modern revival of Passion Plays began with the revival of the York Mystery Plays in 1951 as part of the Festival of Britain, the Chester Mystery Plays in the 1970s and the York and Towneley Plays as part of the Edinburgh Festival in 1977.

== Origin and history in continental Europe ==
=== The Easter play precedent ===
The development of the Passion Play was about the same as that of the Easter Drama. It originated in the ritual of the Church, which prescribes, among other things, that the Gospel on Good Friday should be sung in parts divided among various persons. Later, the Passion Play made its appearance, first in Latin, then in vernacular languages; contents and forms were adapted more and more to audience expectations, until, in the fifteenth century, the popular religious plays had developed. The Benedictbeurn Passion Play (thirteenth century) is still largely composed of Latin ritual sentences in prose and of church hymns, and, being designed to be sung, resembles an oratorio.

=== Addition of music and characters ===
Yet even this oldest of the Passion Plays already shows a tendency to break away from the ritual and to adopt a more dramatic form. This evolution is shown by the interpolation of free translations of church hymns and of German verses not pertaining to such hymns, as well as by the appearance of Mary (the Virgin Mary, mother of Jesus) and Mary Magdalene in the action. From these humble beginnings, the Passion Play developed very rapidly, since in the fourteenth century it was at a stage of development that could not have been reached except by repeated practice. From this second period, we have the Vienna Passion, the St. Gall Passion, the oldest Frankfort Passion, and the Maestricht Passion. All four Plays, as they are commonly called, are written in rhyme, principally in German.

=== Expansion ===
The Vienna Passion embraces the entire history of the Redemption, and begins with the revolt and fall of Lucifer; the play, as transmitted to us, ends with Jesus and his Twelve Apostles sitting at the Last Supper.

The oldest Frankfort Passion play, that of Canon Baldemar von Peterwell (1350–1381), the production of which required two days, was more profusely elaborated than the other Passion Plays of this period. Of this play only the Ordo sive Registrum has come down to us, a long roll of parchment for the use of the director, containing stage directions and the first words of the dialogues. The plays based on this list of directions lead us to the period in which the Passion Play reached its highest development (1400–1515). During this period the later Frankfort Passion Play (1467), the Alsfelder, and the Friedberger (1514) originated. Connected with this group are the Eger, the Donaueschingen, Augsburg, Freising and Lucerne Passion Plays, in which the whole world drama, beginning with the creation of man and brought down to the coming of the Holy Ghost, is exhibited, and which was produced with great splendour as late as 1583.

== The Tyrolese Passion Play ==
=== Expansion and consolidation of previous plays ===
Nearly all these Passion Plays have some relation to those coming from the Tyrol, some contributing to, others taking from, that source. These, again, are founded upon the Tyrolese Passion play which originated during the transition period of the fourteenth to the fifteenth century. Historian J. E. Wackernell, with the aid of the plays that have reached us, has reconstructed this period. In Tyrol the Passion Plays received elaborate cultivation; at Bolzano they were presented with great splendour and, in 1514, lasted no less than seven days. Here, too, the innovation of placing the female roles in the hands of women was introduced, which innovation did not become general until during the seventeenth century.

=== Elaborate, public productions ===
The magnificent productions of the Passion Plays during the fifteenth century are closely connected with the growth and increasing self-confidence of the cities, which found its expression in noble buildings, ecclesiastical and municipal, and in gorgeous public festivals. The artistic sense and the love of art of the citizens had, in co-operation with the clergy, called these plays into being, and the wealth of the citizens provided for magnificent productions of them on the public squares, whither they migrated after expulsion from the churches. The citizens and civil authorities considered it a point of honour to render the production as rich and diversified as possible. Ordinarily, the preparations for the play were in the hands of a spiritual brotherhood, the play itself being considered a form of divine mystical worship. People of the most varied classes took part in the production, and frequently the number of actors was as high as two hundred and even greater. It was undoubtedly no small task to drill the performers, particularly since the stage arrangements were still very primitive and raw

=== Staging and set design ===
The stage was a wooden structure, almost as broad as it was long, elevated but slightly above the ground and open on all sides. A house formed the background; a balcony attached to the house represented Heaven. Under the balcony three crosses were erected. Sometimes the stage was divided into three sections by doors. Along the sides of the stage, taken lengthwise, stood the houses required for the production; they were indicated by fenced-in spaces, or by four posts upon which a roof rested. The entrance into Hell was pictured by the mouth of a monster, through which the Devil and the souls captured or released during the plays passed back and forth. The actors entered in solemn procession, led by musicians or by a præcursor (herald), and took their stand at the places appointed them. They remained on the stage all through the performance; they sat on the barriers of their respective divisions, and were permitted to leave their places only to recite their lines. As each actor finished speaking, he returned to his place. The audience stood around the stage or looked on from the windows of neighbouring houses. Occasionally platforms, called "bridges", were erected around the stage in the form of an amphitheatre.

=== Simplicity of scenery, dialogue, action, and costumes ===
The scenery was the background of old-time middle east. There were no side scenes, and consequently no stage perspective. Since an illusion of reality could not be had, indications were made to suffice. Thus a cask standing on end represents the mountain on which Christ is tempted by the Devil; thunder is imitated by the report of a gun; in order to signify that the Devil had entered into him, Judas holds a bird of black plumage before his mouth and makes it flutter. The suicide of Judas is an execution, in which Beelzebub performs the hangman's duty. He precedes the culprit up the ladder and draws Judas after him by a rope. Judas has a black bird and the intestines of an animal concealed in the front of his clothing, and when Satan tears open the garment the bird flies away, and the intestines fall out, whereupon Judas and his executioner slide down into Hell on a rope. A painted picture representing the soul, is hung from the mouth of each of the two thieves on the cross; an angel takes the soul of the penitent, the devil that of the impenitent thief. Everything is presented in the concrete, just as the imagination of the audience pictures it, and the scenic conditions, resembling those of the antique theatre demand. All costume, however, is contemporary, historical accuracy being ignored.

== Rediscovery of the Passion Play ==
=== Decline ===
School dramas now came into vogue in Catholic and Protestant schools, and frequently enough became the battle-ground of religious controversies. When, in the 17th century the Jesuit drama arose, the Passion Plays (still largely secularized) were relegated to out-of-the-way villages and to the monasteries, particularly in Bavaria and Austria. Towards the end of the eighteenth century, during the Age of Enlightenment, efforts were made in Catholic Germany, particularly in Bavaria and the Tyrol, to destroy even the remnants of the tradition of medieval plays.

=== Revival ===
Public interest in the Passion Play developed in the last decades of the 19th century, and the statistician Karl Pearson wrote a book about them.

Since then, Brixlegg and Vorderthiersee in Tyrol and Horice na Sumave, near Cesky Krumlov in the Czech Republic, and above all, the Oberammergau in Upper Bavaria attract thousands to their plays.

The text of the play of Vorderthiersee (Gespiel in der Vorderen Thiersee) dates from the second half of the seventeenth century, is entirely in verse, and comprises in five acts the events recorded in the Gospel, from the Last Supper to the Entombment. A prelude (Vorgespiel), on the Good Shepherd, precedes the play. After being repeatedly remodelled, the text received its present classical form from the Austrian Benedictine, P. Weissenhofer. Productions of the play, which came from Bavaria to the Tyrol in the second half of the eighteenth century, were arranged at irregular intervals during the first half of the nineteenth century; since 1855 they have taken place at regular intervals, at Brixlegg every ten years. The Höritz Passion Play, the present text of which is from the pen of Provost Landsteiner, has been produced every five years, since 1893.

== Modern performances of the Passion Play ==
=== Belgium ===
In belgium, there are four Passions play.

The Passion Play of Ligny, founded in 1925 by the Abbey Mailleux, is made every year.

- The Passion of Sibret, in the Belgian Ardenne.
- The Passion Play of Kelmis
- The Passion Play of Schönberg

=== Australia ===
In Australia, several major productions of The Passion are staged annually during the lead up to Easter.

- The Iona Passion Play was founded in 1958 in Queensland, and tours cities and towns around Australia. In each location the touring cast invites community members to join the production.
- The Moogerah Passion Play, established in 1993, is produced annually, at Easter time, in Queensland. It is staged "realistically" at The Lake Theatre, a large, purpose built, lakeside theatre designed specifically for the Moogerah Passion Play. Contemporary versions of the play endeavour to use different Bibles to convey messages to the audience every year.
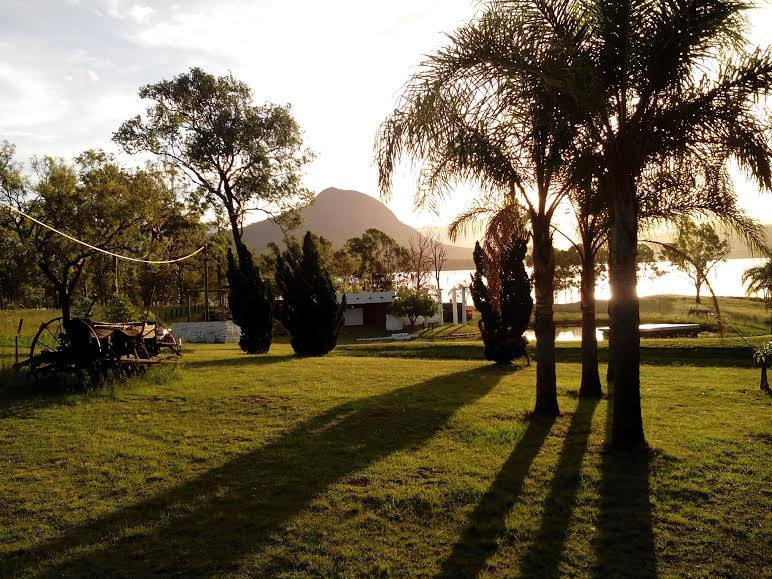
  The Lake Theatre, Moogerah Queensland Australia
- In New South Wales, at Turramurra, The Turramurra Passion is a contemporary, character-driven interpretation, using multimedia elements and an original score that was established 1999.
- Other dramas with redemptionist themes, such as Dorothy L. Sayers' The Just Vengeance, as produced at the Melbourne Town Hall in 1947, have been described as "passion plays".

=== Bavaria ===
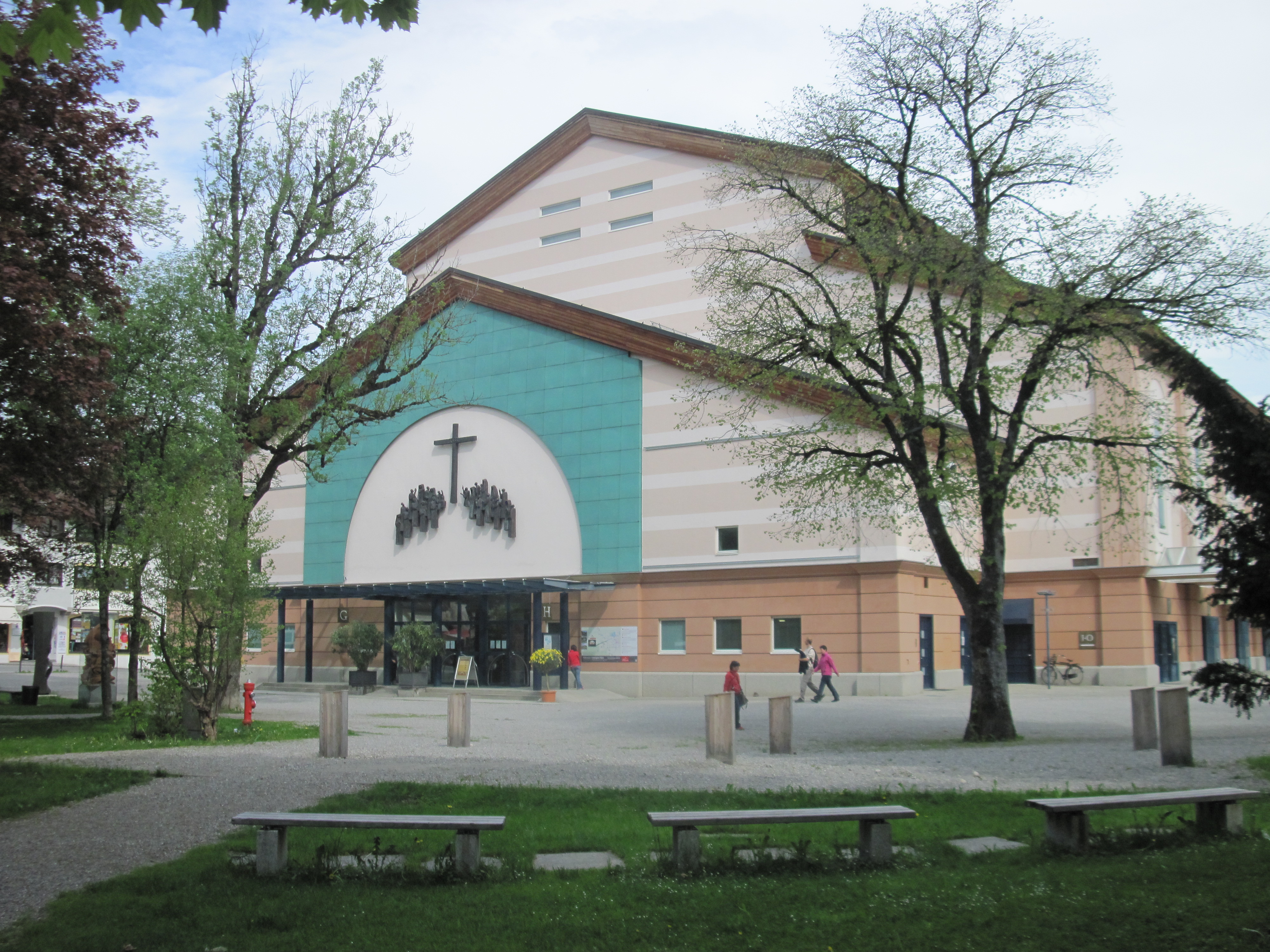
Oberammergau Theatre (2013)

The chief survivor of former times is the Oberammergau Passion Play, first performed in the Bavarian village of Oberammergau in 1634 and now performed every 10 years. The next Oberammergau Passion Play was to take place in 2020 but was delayed to 2022 amid COVID-19 concerns.

In 2010, about half the inhabitants of Oberammergau took part in the once-a-decade Passion Play; over 2,000 villagers brought the story of Jesus of Nazareth to life for audiences that flocked in from around the world. In accordance with tradition, the play started with Jesus entering Jerusalem, continued with his death on the cross, and finished with the Resurrection.

2010 saw a new production directed by Christian Stückl, director at Munich's noted Volkstheater. He was supported by the artistic team that, along with him, staged the 2000 Passion Play: deputy director and dramatic adviser Otto Huber, set and costume designer Stefan Hageneier, music director Marxus Zwink, and conductor Michael Bocklet. All four of these collaborators are from Oberammergau. The play started at 14.30 and included a three-hour interval, ending at 22.30. Performances took place between mid-May and early October 2010.

=== Italy ===
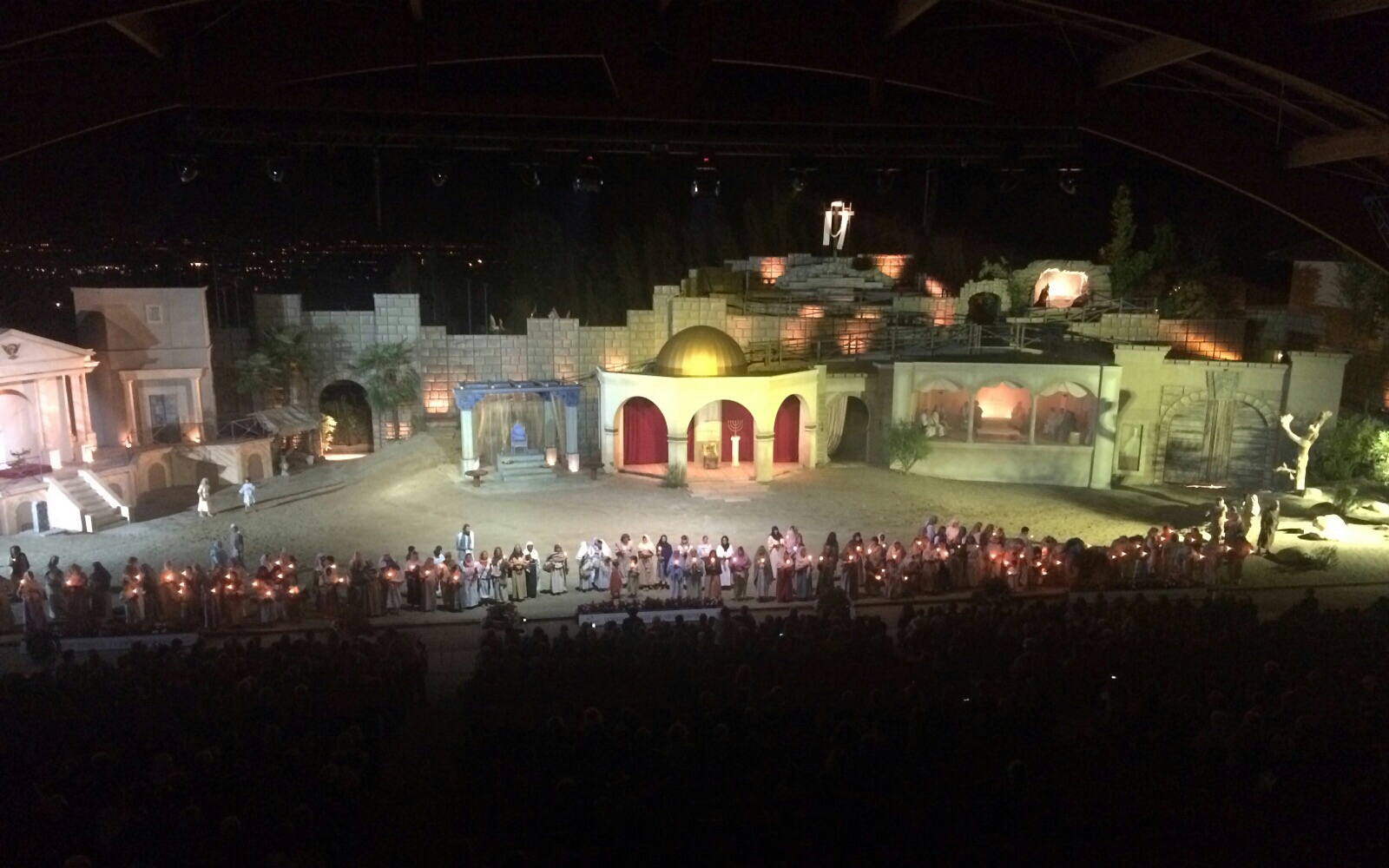
Overall view of the theatre in 2015 in Sordevolo, Italy

The Passion of Christ is performed in Sordevolo (Piedmont) every five years since 1816, from June to September, by all the inhabitants of the village in an open-air amphitheatre 4,000 square meters wide, of 2,400 seats under cover. In front of the audience is rebuilt a corner of Jerusalem. Each actor involved (about 500 people) is a volunteer, as well as who works "behind the scenes"(about 300 people) for scenography, costumes, script, horses. It is one of the greatest shows about the Passion of Christ in Italy, sacred in the topic, popular in its realization. About 40 shows are performed for each season. The next edition was planned for 2020, but has been postponed to summer 2022 due to the Coronavirus pandemic (June–September).

=== Brazil ===
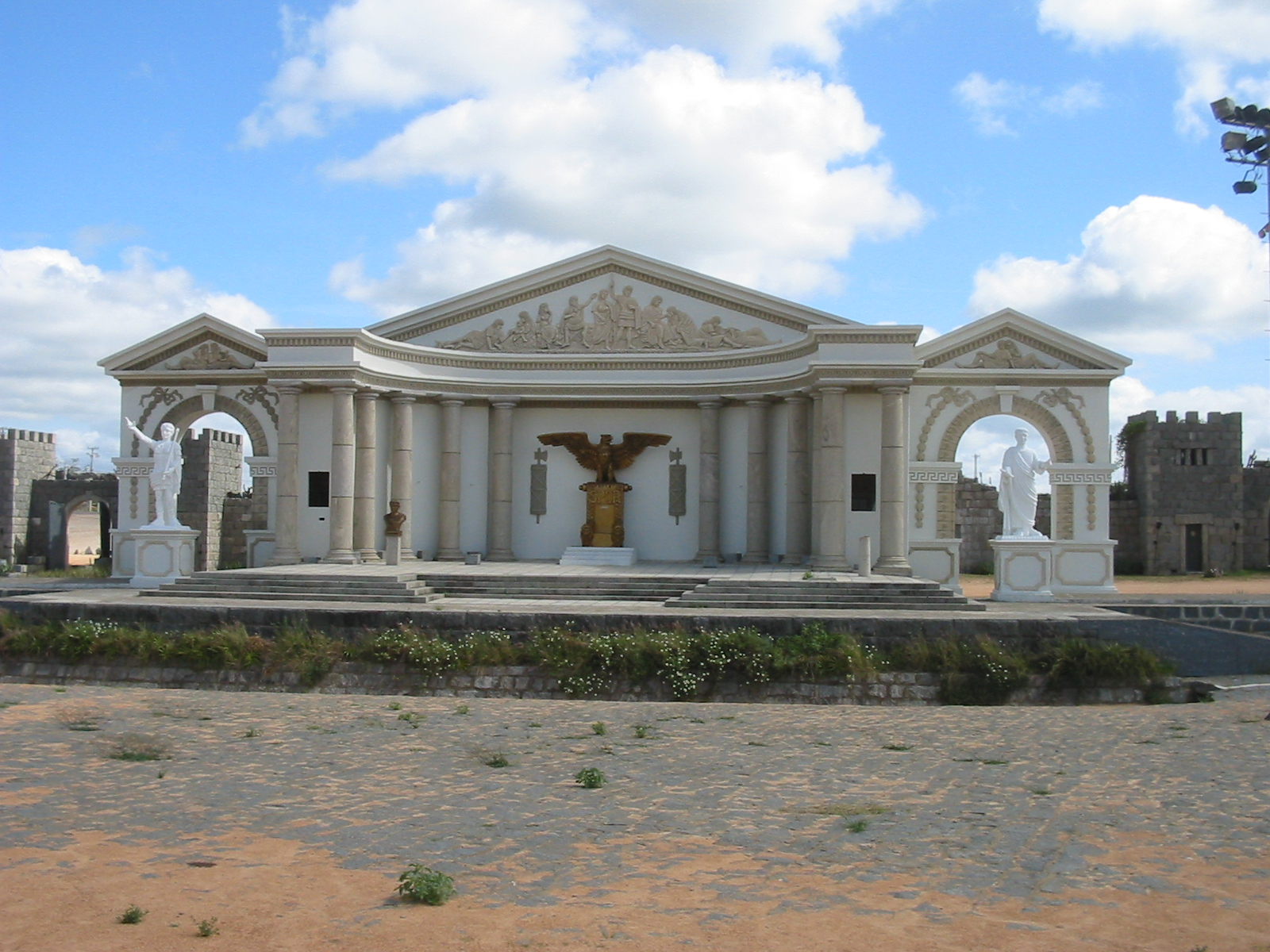
Roman Forum stage, in New Jerusalem

The Passion of the Christ is performed every year during Easter, in a purpose-built 100,000-square-metre (1,100,000 sq ft) theatre-city in the arid backlands of Pernambuco, in northeastern Brazil. It is considered to be the largest open-air theatre in the world. Thousands of visitors arrive every year to watch the performance; over 500 actors appear on the nine separate stages within the stone walls of the New Jerusalem city-theatre, founded in 1968. 2.2 miles of walls and 70 towers flank the outer perimeter of the New Jerusalem Theater. The first passion play in the town took place in 1951, and consisted only of a few family and friends playing all of the roles. In 1963, the townspeople began constructing a replica Jerusalem in Brejo da Madre de Deus. The nine separate stages include The Upper Room, the Roman Forum, Herod's palace, Bethesda Lake and the Sepulcher. During 8 performances during the Holy Week, an average of 8,000 people per show from around the globe follow the actors as they move through "ancient Jerusalem", portraying every step of the Passion of Christ. In the 2010 season, when the 43rd anniversary of the Passion of Christ in Nova Jerusalem was celebrated, the public reached a record 80,000 people, coming from 22 Brazilian states and 12 countries.

=== Canada ===
- The Canadian Badlands Passion Play is performed annually in Drumheller, Alberta. It is staged outdoors in a naturally occurring amphitheatre in the hills of the Drumheller valley. Performers are a mix of professionals and volunteers from across Alberta and Canada, with nearly 300 actors and musicians annually.
- In Hamilton, Ontario, Cardinal Newman Catholic Secondary School puts on a Passion Play annually for all the students who attend it.
- In Kingston, Ontario, a full-scale Passion Play production has been traditionally performed for decades at the Kingston Gospel Temple, a Pentecostal worship center. The production features local amateur and professional talent.
- In Manitoba, located in the La Riviere Valley at Oak Valley's Outdoor theatre, located on the edge of the Pembina Valley. The cast and crew are volunteers from all over southern Manitoba. Rehearsals usually start in April or early May and are ready for mid-July performances.
- In Thornhill, Ontario, in what has become an annual tradition at St. Joseph the Worker Parish, over 200 parish youth and young adults annually come together to present the Life and Passion of Christ.
- In Queensway Cathedral (Toronto, Ontario) a Passion Play takes place during the Easter Season. For more than 20 years, the Church on the Queensway (formally Queensway Cathedral) has presented different versions of the Passion Play in their 3200-seat venue, using hundreds of volunteers, live animals, singers and dancers. The play has become a favorite, and most shows experience capacity crowds. This presentation is known for its powerful portrayal of the life of Christ, dramatic resurrection, and ascension scenes.
- There is also a well-known Passion Play in Vaughan, Ontario, organized by St. Peters Parish and performed at Holy Cross Catholic Academy.
- Church of the Rock, an interdenominational church in Winnipeg, Manitoba, performs annual passion plays themed around movies such as Back to the Future and Pirates of the Caribbean. Their Avengers-themed play went viral in 2022.

=== Hungary ===
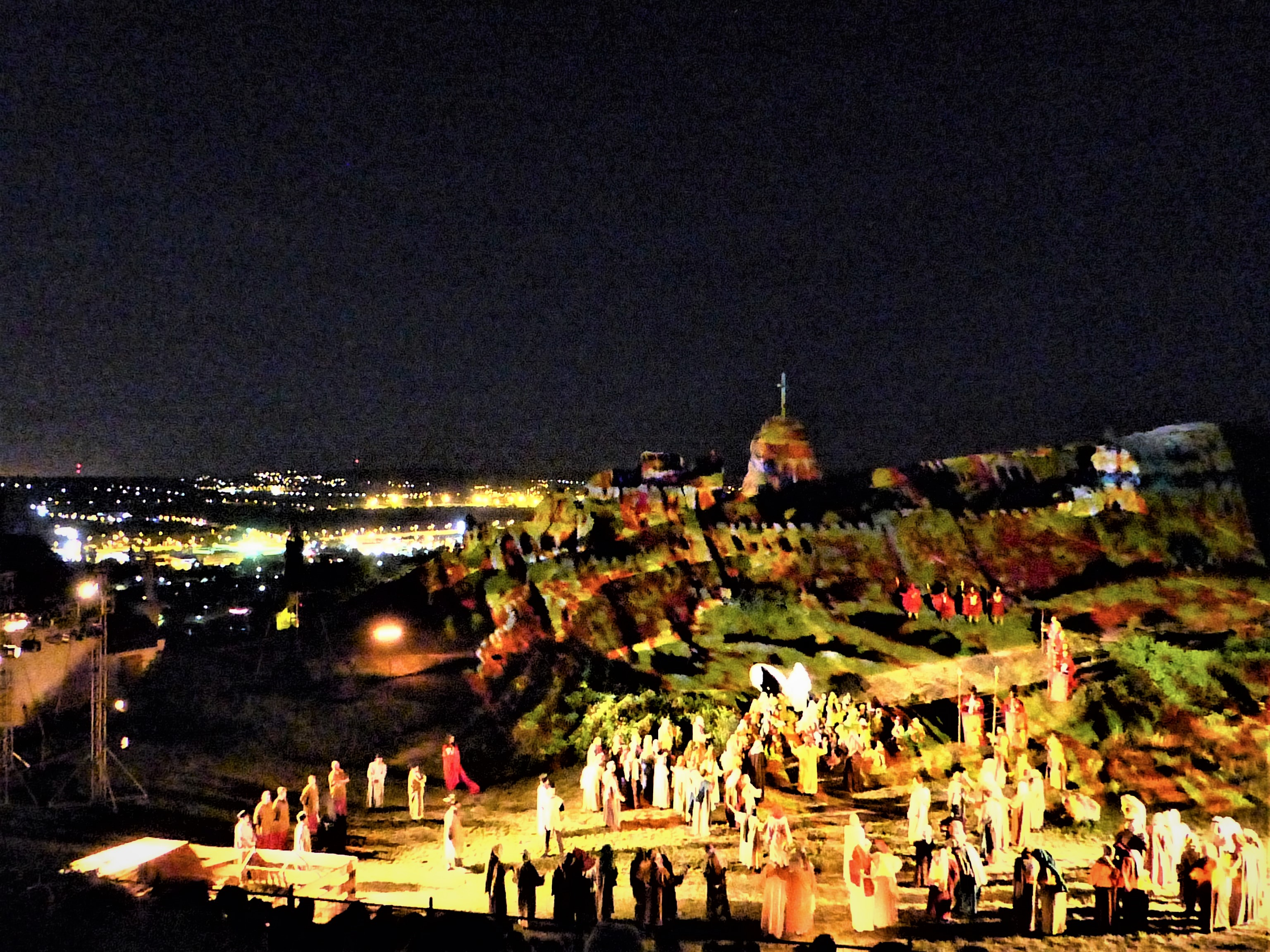
Budaörs Passion Play 2018

Kőhegy (Stone Mountain) Chapel at Budaörs was built by Franz Wendler to whom Virgin Mary had appeared in a dream. He supposedly dreamt of a dog rose on Stone Mountain, every flower of which bore the face of Mary. On the petals he read: "I am the Immaculate Conception". In spring 1855, Wendler started construction. On 15 October 1855, the chapel was consecrated to Mary's Immaculate Conception. Franz Wendler lived in a cave next to the chapel from 1878 until his death. The chapel is one of the most important pilgrimage places for Germans of Hungary in the area of Buda. Every three years, Budaörs' inhabitants stage a passion play with Hungarian and German text.

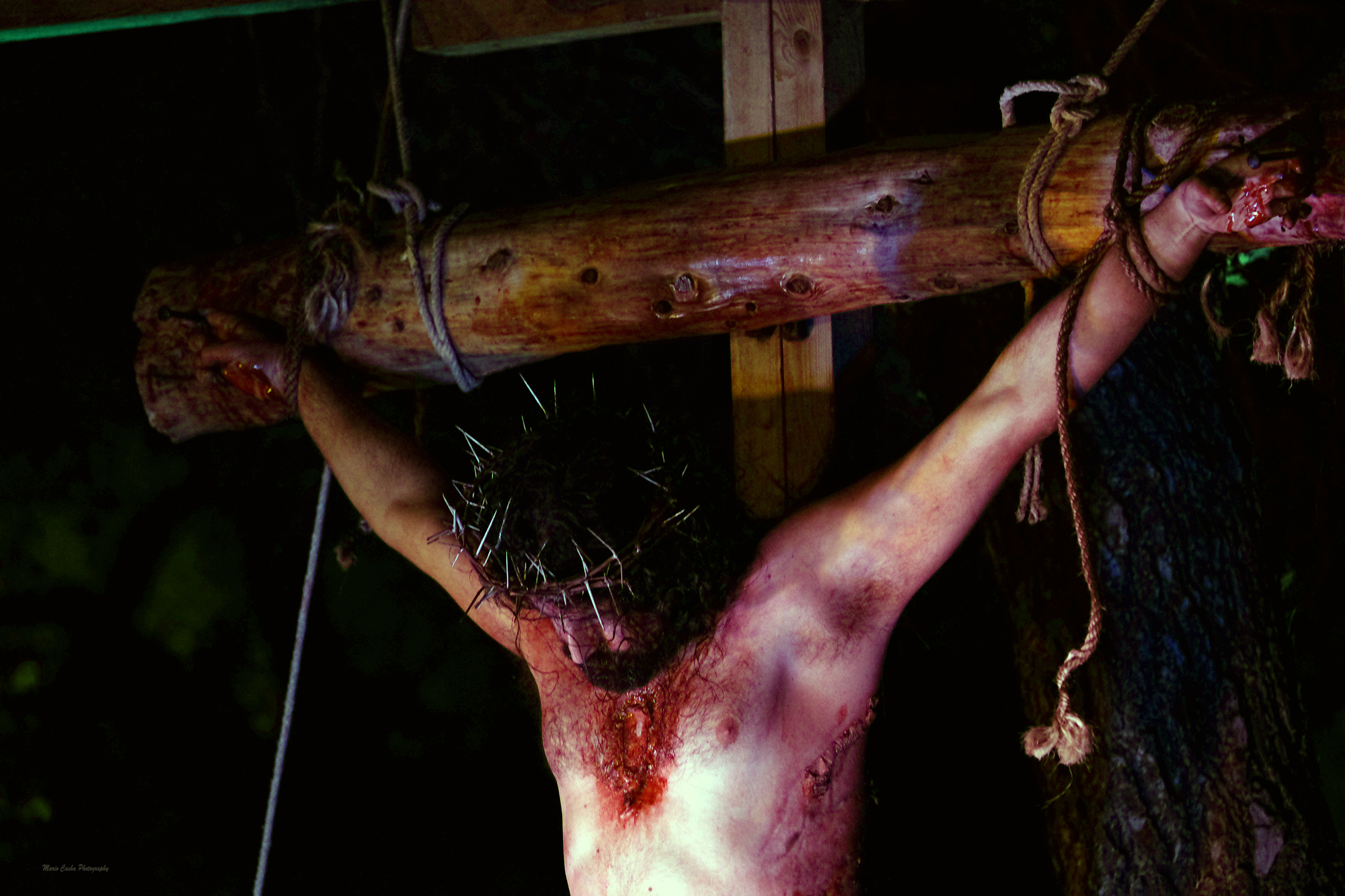
Alan Fenech interpreting Jesus Christ in Il-Mixja

=== Malta ===
The island nation of Malta features many Passion Plays, put on by provincial club, societies, and theatres in various localities. Each village and town often hosts several plays, and there is some competition among the troupes to put on the most moving or beautiful display. These are often combined with processions and wirjiet ("exhibitions") that feature models and renditions of the Passion.

Since 2007, a Passion Play entitled Il-Mixja, with Jesus being played by popular Maltese actor Alan Fenech and featuring some of the most highly acclaimed actors in Malta, has become one of the highlights of the genre on the island with the audience experiencing the passion of Jesus Christ as if they were present on the streets of Jerusalem during those historical two days. The play is held outdoors and has so far been held four times in the streets of Rabat, once at Ħaġar Qim temples and four times (2013–2016) for charity on the grounds surrounding Mount Carmel Hospital. In 2017 the event was held at the presidential Verdala palace in aid of the Malta Community Chest Fund. In 2018 it was held both at Verdala Palace and on the grounds surrounding Mount Carmel Hospital whereas in 2019 the production once again changed location to the Romeo Romano Gardens in Santa Venera with once again the Malta Community Chest Fund Foundation and the service users of Mount Carmel Hospital being the beneficiaries of this charity event. The 2020 edition was cancelled due to COVID-19, however 2021 will see the production being transformed into a virtual experience screened in cinemas and online. It also marked Alan Fenech's last time in the role of Jesus, the role being taken up as from 2022 by John Vassallo. Since the 2022 edition, it has always been held in the gardens of the Verdala Palace and under the distinct patronage of the President of the Republic of Malta. All proceeds go towards the Malta Community Chest Fund Foundation.

=== The Netherlands ===
- De Passiespelen is a re-enactment of the Passion of the Christ taking place every year that is divisible by 5, e.g., in 2005 and 2010. It is performed in the open air in Openluchttheater De Doolhof, in Tegelen. It originated in 1931 and has become an internationally acclaimed event drawing visitors from all over the world.
- Since 2011, Nederland 3 has broadcast The Passion, a live television musical that features a rendition of the story set in the present day, accompanied by popular music. Serving as a Dutch adaptation of BBC Three's special, Manchester Passion (2006), it has since been held annually in different cities, with the 2015 edition seen by approximately 3.57 million viewers. The concept has also been sold as a television format to other countries, such as Belgium and the United States.

=== The Philippines ===
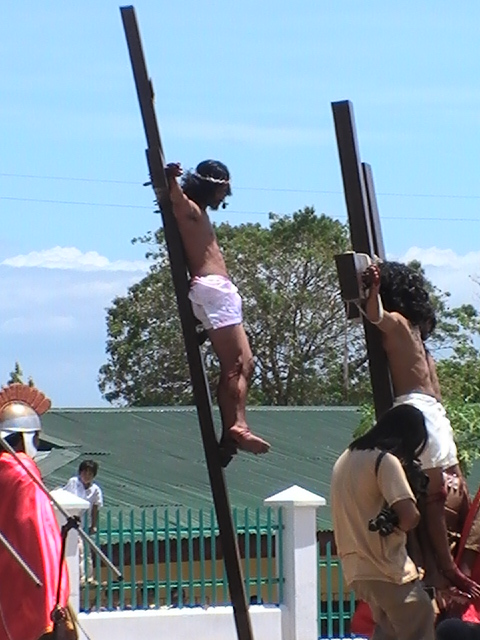
Actor portraying Jesus on the cross during the Pagtaltal in Barotac Viejo, Iloilo, Philippines, April 2010

The predominantly Catholic Philippines has Passion Plays called Senákulo, named after the Upper room, every Semana Santa (Holy Week). Theatre companies and community groups perform different versions of the Senákulo, using their own scripts that present the dialogue in either poetic or prosaic form. These scripts are decades or even centuries-old, and draw from both the Bible and folk tradition.

Costumes and scenery in traditional Senákulo conform to Hispanic iconography instead of actual historical realism, which is more common with recent productions (particularly by professional companies). Some productions use ropes to hold actors on crosses while others use actual nails.

One of the more popular Senákulo is Ang Pagtaltal in Jordan, Guimaras, which began in 1975 and draws some 150,000 visitors annually. Some people perform crucifixions outside of Passion Plays to fulfill a panatà (vow for a request or prayer granted), such as the famous penitents in Barangay San Pedro Cutud, San Fernando, Pampanga.

=== Poland ===
Tradition of Passion Plays in Poland has become popular again in the early 20th century. Today the best known plays take place in Kałków, Kalwaria Pacławska, the Pallotines' Seminary in Ołtarzew, and the most prominent in Sanctuary of Kalwaria Zebrzydowska. This Passion Play is one of the oldest.

- Since 1998, there has been a yearly Passion Play in Poznan, performed on Palm Sunday in open air of Cytadela City Park. Now it is the biggest performance of this kind in Europe. In 2009, 100,000 pilgrims were expected to attend.

=== Slovenia ===
In the 17th and 18th century, Passion Plays were organised in the towns of the Slovene Lands, like Kranj, Ljubljana, and Novo Mesto. Their language was German, Slovene, or both. They were all based on the tradition of the Ljubljana Passion Play, which was organised by Capuchins and first performed from ca. 1608 until ca. 1613. The most distinguished of them has been the Škofja Loka Passion Play. It was written by Father Romuald in 1715, with modifications until 1727, on the basis of an older tradition. It is the oldest preserved play in Slovene as well as the oldest preserved director's book in Europe and the only one extant from the Baroque period. The Škofja Loka Passion Play was performed each year until 1767. The procession was revived in 1999, and reprised in 2000 and 2009, with further reprisals planned for 2015 and 2021. The play's reprisals are the largest open-air theatre production in Slovenia.

=== Spain ===
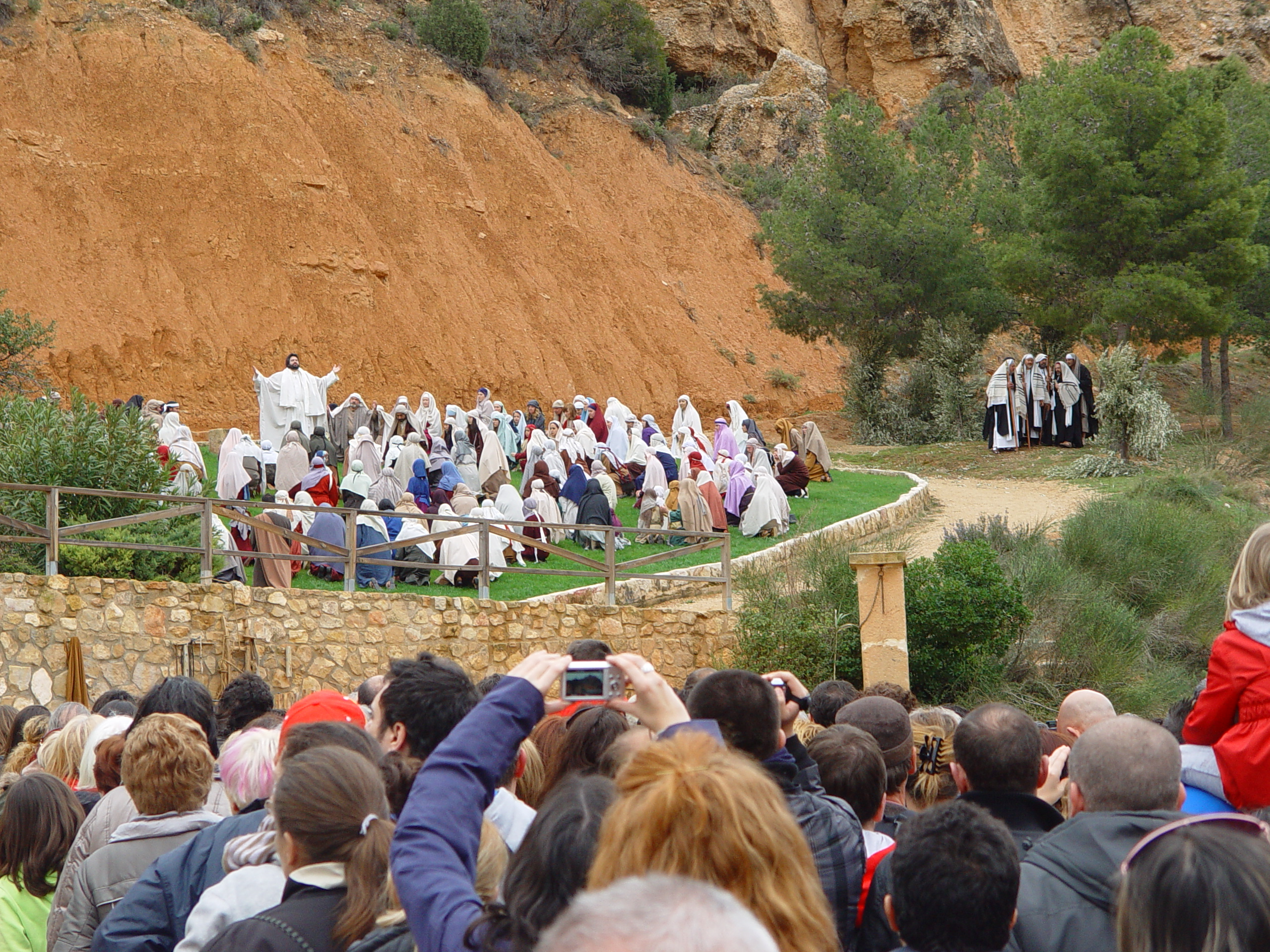
'Drama de la Cruz', Monte Calvario, Alcorisa. Part of Ruta del Tambor y el Bombo.

In Catalonia, it is common for villages to present different Passion Plays every Easter, like the ones in Esparreguera, Olesa de Montserrat, Ulldecona or Cervera, first documented in 1538. Olesa's 1996 production surpassed the world record for the most people acting on stage at the same time, with 729 persons. Balmaseda, in the Spanish Basque Country, holds the leading Passion Play in the region.

=== Sri Lanka ===
The earliest Passion Plays in Sri Lanka, at Vanny in Mannar, Pesalai, Pamanugama, Mutuwal, Pallansena, Kalamulla, Duwa and Pitipana in Negombo, used life-size statues instead of living actors. Influenced by the Oberammergau Passion Play, K. Lawrence Perera, began the practice of using living actors in the Borelassa Passion Play. Women later began to take part in the play. However, for a period of time after 1939, the Archbishop of Colombo banned performances because of his disapproval of the women's participation. In the late 20th and early 21st centuries, there are many Passion Play enactments in Sri Lanka:

- Duwa Passion Play, near Negombo (1988)
- The Yagaya Passion Play at Kandawala, Katana (1990/92)
- Aho mage Senageni and Aho mage senageni at Halpe, Katana (1990s)
- Kurusiya Matha Miyadunemi, a modern Passion Play enacted in the villages of Katuwapitiya and Bolawalana in Negombo (1999, 2000, 2001)
- Thambakande Paskuwa at St. Bruno's Church in Negombo with a large number of celebrities as actors (2012)
- Tharakayano, the first ballet style Passion Play, enacted in Negombo (2012).
- Maha Premaya, the Easter passion play, was enacted on 24 March 2018 at Dungalpitiya, Don Bosco auditorium in Negombo. Over 80 actors participated. Produced by Rev. Fr. Manjula Priyantha (SDB), directed by George Dinesh Manthrige.

=== Thailand ===
The Church of Immaculate Conception and Samta Cruz Church in Bangkok and Chanthaburi holds an annual Passion Play on Good Friday.

=== United Kingdom ===
Passion Plays have taken place all over the UK and between 20 and 30 plays are performed each year in locations throughout the British Isles.

=== United States ===
Arkansas

- In Eureka Springs, Arkansas, The Great Passion Play is regularly performed from May through October, by a cast of 170 actors and dozens of live animals.

Arizona

- The Mesa Arizona Easter Pageant Jesus the Christ began in 1928 as a small sunrise Easter presentation. The pageant is now the "largest annual outdoor Easter pageant in the world." With a 450-member cast, the 65-minute pageant depicts the birth, life, death, and resurrection of Jesus Christ using song and dance.

California

- The Glory of Easter at the Crystal Cathedral in Garden Grove, California is an extremely popular Passion Play and family tradition to Southern Californians. It has a cast of hundreds, live animals, and flying angels, among other unique aspects.
- Since 1993, Church of Good Shepard in Pittsburg, California has been doing their adaptation of the Passion Play. Tryouts are usually held in December and rehearsals are held in January through March, with 5 performances until Good Friday. This event has been held annually since its 1993 incarnation. The theme changes every year. Teens who try out are given scripts, props, costumes, and near the end of rehearsal timing, they do pictures and music. All that had to be done before their first performance, then they have 4 more performances after the first one, with the last one being on Good Friday.

Colorado

- Since 1998, The Thorn has been performing during the Easter season in Colorado Springs. Often described as The Passion of the Christ meets Cirque du Soleil, this epic portrayal of Jesus' life and death features indoor pyrotechnics, acrobats, aerialists, and a cast and crew of nearly 1000. Beginning in 2011, The Thorn started holding an annual national tour and has performed for tens of thousands people in cities that include Charleston, Austin, Denver, Nashville and Seattle.

Connecticut

- For 38 years and counting, the St. Thomas Church of Southington, Connecticut has performed a Passion Play. Made up entirely of volunteers, rehearsals begin in January and conclude with a week's worth of shows prior to Easter, the last show being on Good Friday. Every year it is general admission, and there is no cost to view the play (however, donations are appreciated.)

Florida

- Florida's Passion Play is held in Wauchula, at the Cattleman's Arena, beginning Good Friday and continuing for the next several following weekends. It has a cast of over 200 people and 150 animals.

Georgia

- Atlanta's Passion Play was produced by the First Baptist Church of Atlanta. It ran annually from 1977 to 2011.

Illinois

- In Bloomington, Illinois, The American Passion Play was portrayed annually since 1923 at the Bloomington Center for the Performing Arts and was one of the longest continuously running passion Plays in North America. This play was unique in that it dramatizes Jesus' entire ministry, rather than only the events from Passion Week onward.
- In Zion, Illinois, the Zion Passion Play has been performed at Christ Community Church since 1935.
- Central Christian Church in Mount Vernon, Illinois portrayed "The Gospel of Christ" in an Easter Drama, using members of the church and church staff, choir, and children's groups. It was directed by drummer and church member Jimmy Bass. Although the play was a huge success, it has not been restaged, and is instead copied onto DVDs available at the church.
- Inverness, Illinois – Holy Family Parish teens put on a performance on Good Friday every year.

Michigan

- Andrews University in Berrien Springs, Michigan has been performing an annual indoor and outdoor walk-through Passion Play since 2003. The play's outdoor scenes include a marketplace, and a Roman encampment.

Minnesota

- The North Heights Passion Play was a popular indoor musical stage production sponsored by North Heights Lutheran Church of Arden Hills, Minnesota, a suburb of the Twin Cities. The Minneapolis Star-Tribune says, "With 700 participants, dozens of live animals, flames, rain and 'lightning', North Heights Lutheran Church's annual Passion Play is spectacular." More than 400,000 attended the performances over 19 years before the production was discontinued. Over 20,000 attended the final season, including more than 150 tour buses and groups. Performances began in April 1989 and ended 22 April 2007.

Missouri

- The New Melle Community Passion Play is presented by an all-volunteer ecumenical group in a "theatre in the round" indoor setting. The story of the last days in the life of Christ is told using a script and music, based loosely on the cantata "Then Came Sunday", by Rodger Strader. It has grown in size and popularity over the past 32 years.

Mississippi

- The First United Methodist Church in Kosciusko, Mississippi has been performing their Passion Play for 30 years. It has been a mainstay in the community as well as the state. Members of the Church and community come together to share in fellowship and learn about the last days of Jesus Christ. This is an original script of the Passion, written by a former minister of the church.

New Jersey

- The longest running Passion Play in the United States has been performed in North Hudson, New Jersey since 1915 and at the Park Performing Arts Center since 1931. In 1997, there was a minor controversy when an African-American actor was cast as Jesus.
- The Jesus Story, presented by Bible Baptist Church in Hasbrouck Heights, New Jersey, has been running for 20 years. First starting out as a small representation of the passion of Jesus, this production has developed into a full-time musical performance. Over the years, the play's format has changed focusing on the point of view of several different people including Mary the mother of Jesus, the Roman Soldiers, the Thieves on the Cross, and many others. The show is performed at Felician College in Lodi, New Jersey, and runs for approximately seven shows per year. Every year it is general admission, and there is no cost to view the play.
- He Is Alive! was formerly presented by the Fountain of Life Center, an Assemblies of God church in Burlington, New Jersey. It drew large crowds and attracted visitors to the church in South Jersey and Philadelphia metropolitan area. The play ran from the 1980s until 2016, and included the Easter story from Last Supper, the Crucifixion of Jesus, and the Resurrection of Jesus. The play was performed on 8 nights during the month building up to Easter Sunday, and each show drew an audience of around 1,500–2,000 people. The play was free to attend, but donations were taken and merchandise was sold to fund the production of the play.

Ohio

- The St. John Passion Play, greater Cincinnati Ohio, performed every year without interruption rehearsals beginning in 1917, first performance in Feb. 1918 which seems to make it the oldest annually performed, without interruption in the United States of America. Currently housed in the Lockland Christian Church, Lockland, Ohio (www.locklandchristian.org). A free will offering is suggested for general admission. The beginning of the play traces back to February 1917 when the United States of America was at war. Like other parishes throughout the United States, St. John the Baptist Catholic Church in the Over-the-Rhine neighborhood of Cincinnati had readily given its quota of men to the armed forces during World War 1. Eight of them had already been killed in action. Father Richard Wurth, Franciscan pastor of St. John the Baptist Church, was deeply saddened by the loss of these eight young men and considered how he and his parishioners could merit a special protection of God for the others serving in active duty. He remembered how the wood-carving peasants of Oberammergau in the Bavarian Alps had escaped the Black Death in the 17th century by vowing to produce a Passion Play every ten years in thanksgiving. With hope in his heart, Father Wurth decided on a similar strategy. He produced Veronica, or the Holy Face, a play centered on the passion and death of Christ. After the third and final performance, he called all of the actors together backstage. Realizing there had been no more battle-related casualties, they joined hands in thanksgiving and solemnly pledged to present a passion play annually thereafter for the continued protection of those serving in the war. The following year 1918, the St. John Passion Play was formally established. The closing of St. John the Baptist Church in 1969 almost meant the demise of the Play. However, several committed cast and crew members were determined to keep it alive and organized the St. John Passion Play as a charitable nonprofit corporation. Since then, the Play has been performed every year in numerous churches and auditoriums throughout the greater Cincinnati area and has in recent years been housed on the grounds of the Lockland Christian Church, Lockland, Ohio.
- In Cambridge, Ohio, the Living Word Outdoor Drama has been offered every summer since 1975.
- In Duncan Falls, Ohio, Cornerstone Full Gospel Church has put on the drama Worthy Is The Lamb, for over 30 years. The drama features a cast of over 150+, is free to the public, and is presented on Good Friday and Easter Sunday of each year.

Oklahoma

- One of the U.S.'s longest-running Passion Plays is held at the Holy City of the Wichitas, located within the Wichita Mountains Wildlife Refuge in Oklahoma. The Holy City started as an Easter Passion Play in the Wichita Mountains in 1926. The impetus behind both the pageant and city was the Reverend Anthony Mark Wallock (b. 1890, in Austria). In 1926, he took his Sunday school class up a mountain, where a tableau of the Resurrection was presented. The popularity of this service led to its becoming an annual event. In 1927, the service became nonsectarian and was referred to by the Lawton Constitution as "Oklahoma's Oberammergau".
- Since 1990, the Muskogee First Assembly of God has performed a widely popular version of the passion beginning Good Friday and running through Easter under the direction of Debra Rose. The drama utilizes acting, music, dance and live animals by a volunteer cast and crew of 50.

Pennsylvania

- In Downingtown, Pennsylvania, the Hopewell United Methodist Church has performed a version of the play in a 1,000 seat outdoor amphitheater each year since 1963. The original version of The Passion Play, initiated in 1963, is based in the King James Version of the Bible, but a newer version, entitled The Power and The Glory was launched in 2005, based in several modern-language translations of the Bible. The church offers both versions on successive weekends in June each year as a free offering to their audience.
- In Harrisburg, Pennsylvania, Harrisburg Christian Performing Arts Center performs annual Passion Plays during the two weekends before Easter. They have been doing this since 1973, with 2013 marking their 40th annual Passion Play. The Passion Plays produced here are written by staff members, and music under public domain is added to give it a musical aspect. A new play is produced every year, apart from the 40th Passion Play The Keys, which was previously produced in the early 90s.

South Dakota

- The Black Hills Passion Play was performed every summer for almost 70 years in Spearfish, South Dakota; this production was an American version of the Lünen Passion Play that was brought over in 1932 by immigrants, who claimed that it had been produced since 1242. The production was Americanized by seventh-generation Passion Player Josef Meier, who toured it around the country before bringing it to Spearfish in the 1930s; until its last performance on 31 August 2008, the show was produced under the auspices of Meier's daughter Johanna, a world-famous opera singer who had her debut in the play at the age of five weeks. During the winter months from 1953 through 1998, the same cast also performed the play in Lake Wales, Florida.

Tennessee

- East Tennessee has hosted many Passion Plays, including The Smoky Mountain Passion Play in Townsend, Tennessee from 1973 to 1992, The Great Passion Play at Pigeon Forge, Tennessee in 1988, and The Gatlinburg, Tennessee Musical Passion Play, which closed in 1996.

Texas

- The Passion is performed annually in downtown San Antonio, Texas, with a procession leading from Milam Park to San Fernando Cathedral.
- One of the most widely viewed modified passion plays in the United States is The Promise, performed near Glen Rose, Texas. Between Glen Rose and its sister production in Branson, Missouri, over one million people have seen The Promise.
- The Play has also been performed in Hughes Springs, Texas as The Passion Play.

Utah

- The Mormon Miracle Pageant is performed every summer in Manti, Utah, by members of the Church of Jesus Christ of Latter-day Saints. It includes a visitation by Jesus Christ, shortly after His resurrection, to inhabitants of ancient America, as recorded in The Book of Mormon.

Virginia

- The American version of the Oberammergau Passion Play was performed in Strasburg, Virginia, each summer from 1973 to 1986. This version was originally written by Val Balfour. Locals volunteered as extras, and church groups came from all over Virginia, Maryland, etc. to see the play. The same play toured all over the country in the fall and winter months.
- The Loudoun Passion Play is an outdoor re-enactment of the Easter story that has the audience walk between scenes to follow the story. It has been performed every year since 1986 on Palm Sunday weekend, in parks and other outdoor locations in and around Purcellville, Virginia.

Washington

- In Seattle, Washington, a large group of 8th graders performs the Passion Play at St. Joseph's School, on Palm Sunday and Good Friday. Their piece involves several songs from Jesus Christ Superstar, including "Heaven On Their Minds" and "Trials and Tribulations". This story also involves some minor parts, including the Women with Perfume, Mary Mother of Jesus, Peter denying knowing Jesus, and The Prayer in Gethsemane. This has been tradition at St. Joseph's for over 30 years.

Wisconsin

- From 1990 to 2012, Lighthouse Christian Church's Impact Productions in Fond du Lac, Wisconsin performed The Promise during Holy Week, with breaks in 1995, 2006, and 2009. Beginning in 2000, the show was merged with another production by David T. Clydesdale, The Power of His Love, and the production was entitled The Promise: The Power of His Love.

=== Mexico ===
Passion plays are common in almost all catholic churches across Mexico during Holy Week, especially on Good Friday. They commonly follow the Stations of the Cross. The most famous passion play in the country is the Passion Play of Iztapalapa.

== The Passion Play in motion pictures ==
- 2004's The Passion of the Christ (produced and directed by Mel Gibson) had a plot similar to that of Passion Plays.
- 1989's Jesus of Montreal (Jésus de Montréal) (directed by Denys Arcand) presented the staging of a very unorthodox Passion Play while the players' own lives mirrored the Passion.
- 1966's Andrei Rublev (directed by Andrei Tarkovsky) contains a Passion Play set on a snow-covered hillside which plays out as Andrei recounts the events of Christ's death and expresses his belief that the men who crucified him were obeying God's will.

== Antisemitism in Passion plays ==
Many Passion Plays historically blamed the Jews for the death of Jesus in a polemical fashion, depicting a crowd of Jewish people condemning Jesus to crucifixion and a Jewish leader assuming eternal collective guilt for the crowd for the murder of Jesus, which, The Boston Globe explains, "for centuries prompted vicious attacks – or pogroms – on Europe's Jewish communities". Time magazine in its article, The Problem With Passion, explains that "such passages (are) highly subject to interpretation".

Although modern scholars interpret the "blood on our children" (Matthew 27:25) as "a specific group's oath of responsibility" some audiences have historically interpreted it as "an assumption of eternal, racial guilt". This last interpretation has often incited violence against Jews; according to the Anti-Defamation League, "Passion plays historically unleashed the torrents of hatred aimed at the Jews, who always were depicted as being in partnership with the devil and the reason for Jesus' death". The Christian Science Monitor, in its article, Capturing the Passion, explains that "historically, productions have reflected negative images of Jews and the long-time church teaching that the Jewish people were collectively responsible for Jesus' death. Violence against Jews as 'Christ-killers' often flared in their wake." Christianity Today in Why some Jews fear The Passion (of the Christ) observed that "Outbreaks of Christian antisemitism related to the Passion narrative have been...numerous and destructive."

Some of the oldest currently-running passion plays have had to reckon with past polemic portrayals of Jews in the work. The Oberammergau Passion Play is an especially notable example. First performed in 1634, the play continues to run today. In its original incarnation, the play relied upon the Antisemitic canard that Jews bore greater responsibility than any other group in the killing of Christ. It utilizes juxtaposition between pure Christians and wicked Jews in order to portray a greater battle between fundamental good versus evil.

Hitler attended the Passion Play in Oberammergau twice and praised it for its convincing portrayal of "the menace of Jewry".[1] Although he praised the Passion Play, he also derided Christianity. According to Alan Bullock, writing in Hitler: A Study in Tyranny, Hitler saw Christianity as a religion fit only for slaves, and its teaching as a rebellion against the natural law of selection by struggle of the fittest. Following the events of World War II and the explicit support of Adolf Hitler for the play, several reforms and modifications were made. In the last few decades, it has revised its script and performance with the help of representatives from Jewish organizations.

While Oberammergau is perhaps the most famous example, this was not the only instance of Anti-Semitism or Anti-Semitic rhetoric in a Passion Play. The Towneley Mystery Plays, also known as the Wakefield Mystery Plays, also featured Anti-Semitic imagery, and ran from the late Middle Ages until 1578. It is believed to be one of the earliest and most explicit portrayals of Pontius Pilate as a king or a Jew (and sometimes as king of the Jews) in theatre (although this tradition had already become well-established in paintings and other visual media by this point). Through these stylings, the Jews are further implicated in the killing of Christ as being both the judge and the jury. This consistent rendering was emulated throughout Christendom in the Middle Ages, and is perpetuated in subtler forms even today.

In 1965, a Vatican declaration titled Nostra Aetate held that the crucifixion could not be blamed on the Jewish people, whether they were living in the first century or born after the death of Christ.

The Religion Newswriters Association observed that

"in Easter 2001, three incidents made national headlines and renewed [Jewish and Christian leaders'] fears. One was a column by Paul Weyrich, a conservative Christian leader and head of the Free Congress Foundation, who argued that "Christ was crucified by the Jews." Another was sparked by comments from the NBA point guard and born-again Christian Charlie Ward, who said in an interview that Jews were persecuting Christians and that Jews "had his [Jesus'] blood on their hands." Finally, the evangelical Christian comic strip artist Johnny Hart published a B.C. strip that showed a menorah disintegrating until it became a cross, with each panel featuring the last words of Jesus, including "Father, forgive them, for they know not what they do".

On 16 November 1998, Church Council of Evangelical Lutheran Church in America similarly adopted a resolution prepared by its Consultative Panel on Lutheran-Jewish Relations urging any Lutheran church presenting a Passion Play to adhere to their Guidelines for Lutheran-Jewish Relations, stating that "the New Testament . . . must not be used as justification for hostility towards present-day Jews," and that "blame for the death of Jesus should not be attributed to Judaism or the Jewish people."

In 2003 and 2004 some people compared Mel Gibson's film The Passion of the Christ to these kinds of Passion Plays, but this characterization is hotly disputed; an analysis of that topic is in the article on The Passion of the Christ.

Modern Passion Plays and contemporary re-tellings of the Passion story place greater emphasis on the Biblical account which tells a more complex story. Rather than isolating Jewish people as responsible for the death of Christ, the Bible reminds readers that Jesus was Jewish and his many supporters, friends and family were Jewish. Furthermore, the Bible alludes to the complex political, social and religious reasons that led both Roman and Jewish people to demand that Jesus be crucified.

Modern Passion Plays are supported in their endeavour to address historical prejudices and crimes against Jewish people by the work of many organisations that seek (Christian-Jewish Reconciliation). For example, in 1947, the International Council of Christians and Jews (ICCJ) explored the relationship basis of Christianity and antisemitism and in 2002, the Christian Scholars group issued "A Sacred Obligation: Rethinking Christian Faith in Relation to Judaism and the Jewish People".

The work of the American Jewish Committee, a leading global Jewish advocacy organization, and the Anti-Defamation League in changing the historical abuses of the Oberammergau play has provided greater awareness and understanding for future Passion Plays to learn from.

A recent statement on the website of the Center for Jewish-Christian Understanding & Cooperation (CJCUC) in Israel is described by Rabbi Dr. Shmuly Yanklowitz as 'the most profoundly Jewish-centered interfaith documents ever to be released'. Writing in the Huff Post, he quotes its opening lines "We seek to do the will of our Father in Heaven by accepting the hand offered to us by our Christian brothers and sisters. Jews and Christians must work together as partners to address the moral challenges of our era".

== Supporters of Passion Plays ==
=== Passion Trust ===
Passion Trust logo 2014

The Passion Trust supports the resurgence of Passion Plays in the United Kingdom through resourcing, networking, advocating and financing new and existing plays. Established in 2011, its vision is to energise the growing number of Passion Plays taking place in the UK.

The Passion Trust hosts an annual conference in various locations around the UK, drawing together actors, arts practitioners, producers, directors, fundraisers and journalists to explore new and time-tested approaches to Passion Plays.

=== Europassion ===
Europassion is a large European organisation which supports Passion Plays in Europe. Established in 1982, this umbrella organisation draws together Passion Play communities from countries all over Europe, some of which have been performing their plays for hundreds of years. According to Mons. Fausto Panfili, the Chaplain of the Europassion:

"The experience of the Europassion constantly lets us experience a so far unexplored pathway, so that we can continue to grow. Surmounting a self-referred vision of our own experience obligates us to confront a regional, national, European and universal horizon. That is why a new vision, not fragmentary, is necessary. Unity doesn't mean uniformity. A spiritual energy, stronger and more attentive to cultural elaboration, a more evident solidarity in order to be recognised as bearers of hope, to help the people and communities grow."

== See also ==
- Arrest of Jesus
- Crucifixion of Jesus
- Christian drama
- Dramatic portrayals of Jesus
- Easter Drama
- Gospel
- Jesus Christ Superstar
- Morality play
- Mummers play
- Mystery play
- Resurrection of Jesus
- Sacri Monti of Piedmont and Lombardy
- Sanhedrin trial of Jesus
- Sordevolo
- Ta'ziyeh – an Iranian Shiite Muslim passion play commemorating the martyrdom of Husayn bin Ali
