= Liturgical drama =

Genre of Medieval Christian drama

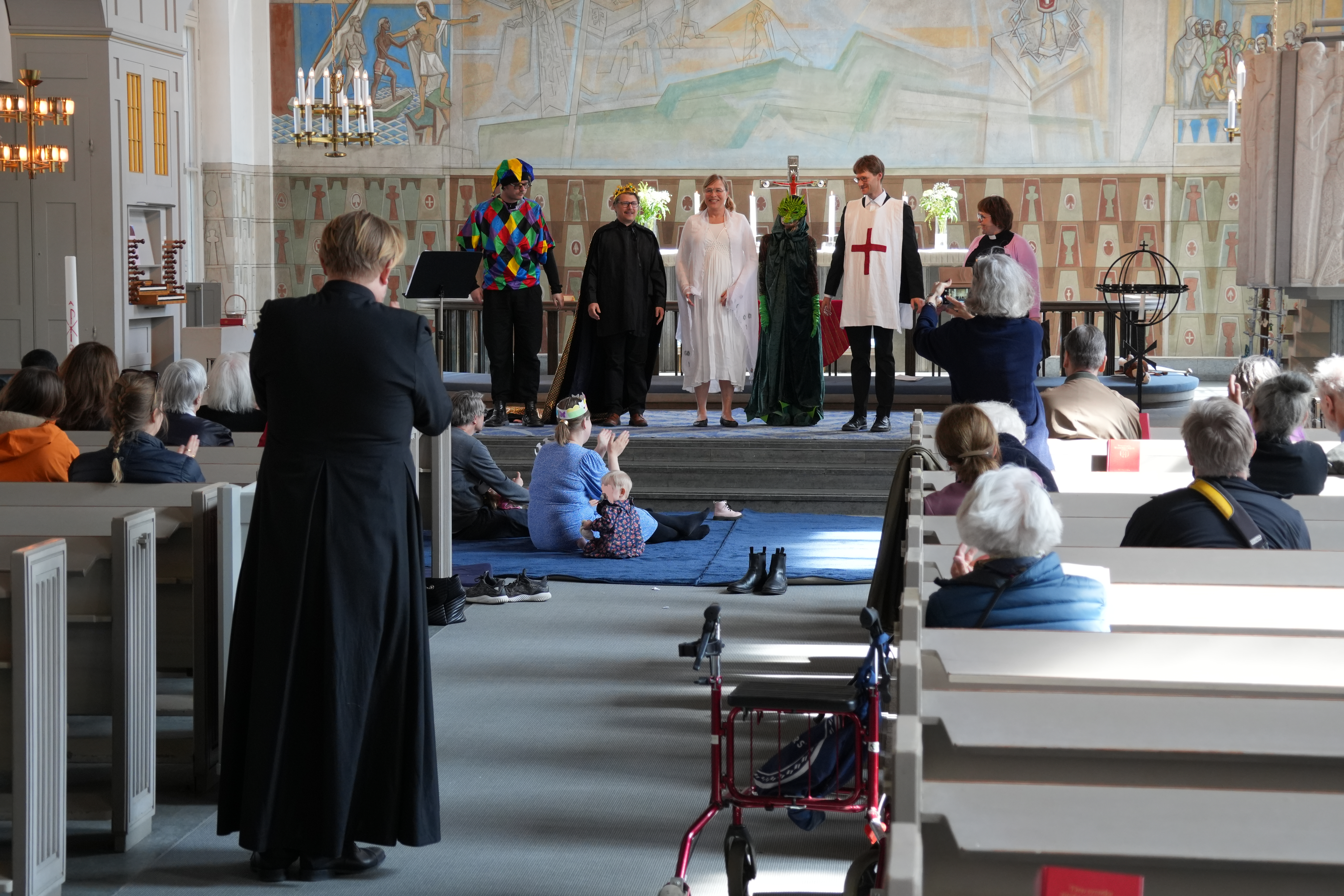
During an Evangelical-Lutheran Mass on Saint George's Day, children reenact the heroism of Saint George at Saint George's Evangelical-Lutheran Church in Stockholm, part of the Church of Sweden.

Liturgical drama refers to medieval forms of dramatic performance that use stories from the Bible or Christian hagiography. The term has developed historically and is no longer used by most researchers. It was widely disseminated by well-known theater historians like Heinrich Alt (Theater und Kirche, 1846), E.K. Chambers (The Mediaeval Stage, 1903) and Karl Young. Young's two-volume monumental work about the medieval church was especially influential. It was published in 1933 and is still read today, even though his theories on liturgical drama have been rejected for more than 40 years. Many college textbooks, among them the popular books by Oscar Brockett, propagated the theory of "liturgical drama" even into the 21st century.

== Critique ==
=== Anachronistic term ===
Since the words “drama” and “dramatic” were very rarely used before the seventeenth century, applying them to the medieval era is problematic. Similarly, "performance" in our contemporary sense is a term introduced during the eighteenth century. Medieval terms like “play,” ludus (game/play), and “revels” could be used to reference any kind of game, festivity, or performance.

=== Evolution model ===
In his 1955 book on the origins of theater, Benjamin Hunningher refuted the notion that plays developed out of the liturgy. He noted that the church setting of the Mass does not allow for entertainment, and Christian theologians had severely criticized theater artists for centuries. As McCall wrote in 2007:

Western Europe was effectively without mainstream drama from the moment that Christianity gained political influence in the fourth century. As early as the second century, the decadence of late Roman drama and the reputed immorality of its practitioners had made the theater one of the professions that had to be abandoned before receiving baptism. Augustine, as is well known, prided himself for having left behind the life of the theater.

By using the liturgical drama theory, authors like Young and Chambers had imposed the Darwinian model of evolution on medieval performance culture, argued O.B. Hardison in 1966. In the wake of Hardison's book, the evolutional theories were commonly considered to have been disproven. Critics argued that there is no logical or structural chronological development in the various play texts that have survived from the Middle Ages. Using Darwinian precepts implied that "drama could develop only from a liturgy that was somehow already embryonically 'drama' itself." Yet no one was able to present a demonstrable "evolution" of simpler into more complex forms when it came to comparing liturgies and dramas. By examining factors such as "historiography, etymology, source study, and analysis" of the texts themselves, Clifford Flanagan and, most recently, Michael Norton, have shown that the term liturgical drama is problematic. Flanagan wrote in 1974:

[...] it has certainly become evident in the last few years that we are only beginning to understand liturgical drama; there is very much to be done yet, and there are probably surprises in store for us. Unless, however, we ground our efforts in a sympathetic understanding of the nature of the Christian liturgy, we are not likely to get very far.

=== Definition ===
Scholars argued against the over-determined term liturgical drama, calling to mind that just because the Mass often included dramatic exposition, commentary, and counterpoint, that did not make it a drama. There may be liturgy in drama and drama in liturgy, but there are several other options. While narrative structures abound in several part of the Mass and its readings, liturgies may also convey visual impressions, solemn processional entries, complex tableaux or lyrics. Stories are not necessarily part of the classic elements of medieval liturgies, like visitatio sepulchri, Passion plays, Jesus descending the cross, shepherd's plays, sorrows of the Virgin Mary, or Corpus Christi plays. Liturgy and drama are, for today's standards, subcategories of a greater phenomenon which the 21st century terms performance or enactment.

The example of Cistercian nuns crowning Marian statues in their monastic enclosure at Wienhausen shows the limits of the notion of "liturgical drama." Caroline Bynum has shown that the crowning ceremonies included alternating clothing for Mary, even royal crowns were donated to the statues. The nuns, for their part, dressed and crowned themselves on given occasions in the liturgical year. The example shows clear aspects of performance and liturgy.

== See also ==
- Medieval theatre

== Bibliography ==
- Olivia Robinson and Aurélie Blanc, 'The Huy Nativity from the Seventeenth to the Twenty-First Century: Translation, Play-Back, and Pray-Back', Medieval English Theatre 40 (2019)
- Benjamin Hunningher, The Origin of the Theater (The Hague, 1955).
- Michael Norton, Liturgical Drama and the Reimagining of Medieval Theater (Kalamazoo, 2017).
