= New Jerusalem Theater =

Theater in Brejo da Madre de Deus, Brazil

New Jerusalem theater
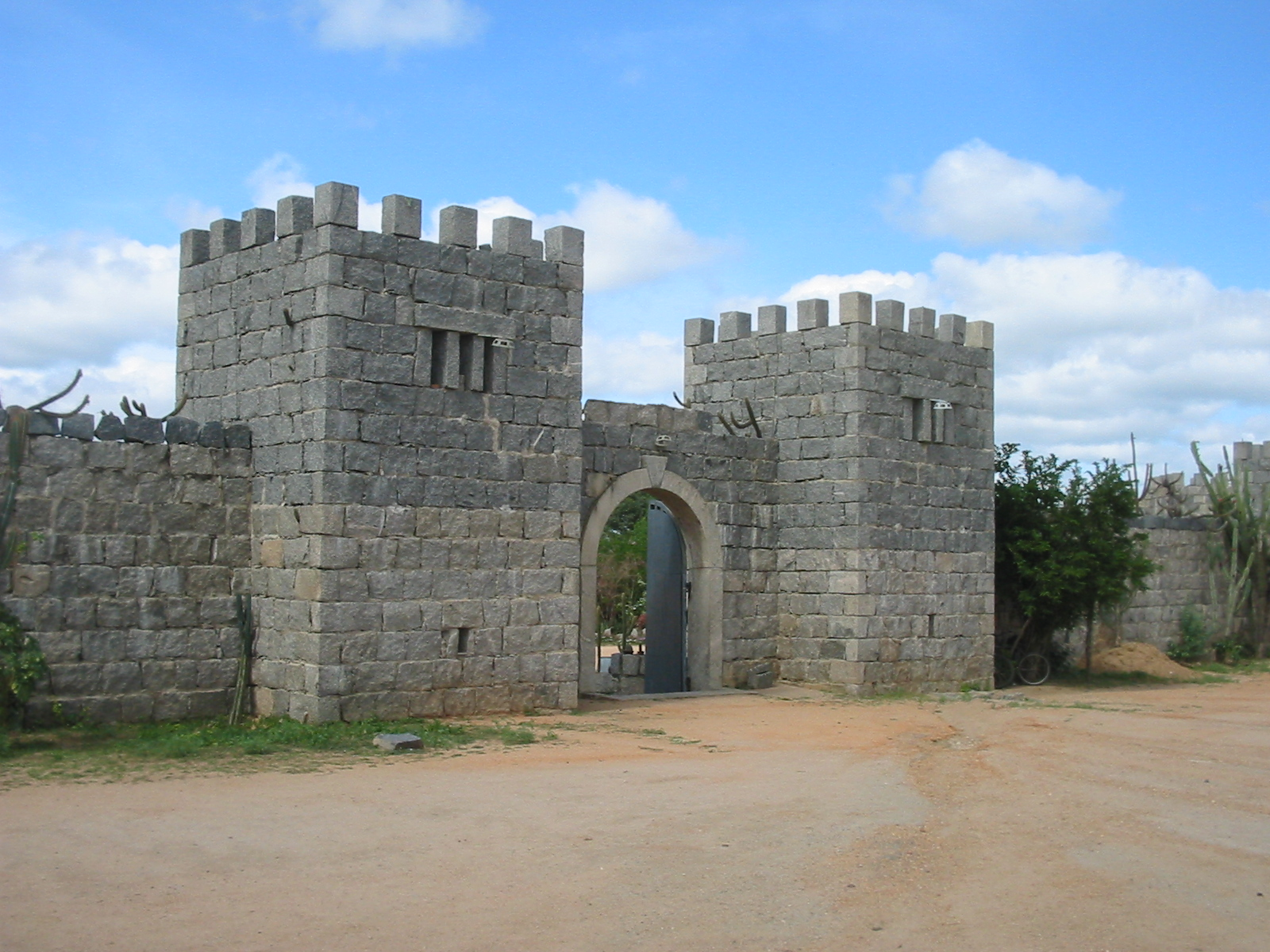
- The theater's external walls
- Interactive map of the New Jerusalem theater area

General information
- Location: Brejo da Madre de Deus, Pernambuco, Brazil
- Coordinates: 8.1822°S 36.1932°W
- Construction started: 1968; 58 years ago

Technical details
- Size: 100,000 square metres (1,100,000 sq ft)

New Jerusalem Theater (Nova Jerusalém) is a city Theater located in Brejo da Madre de Deus, in the district of Fazenda Nova, approximately 180 kilometers (110 mi) from Recife. Established in 1968, this large open-air theater is known for hosting an outdoor Passion of Christ performance every Easter.

New Jerusalem theatre is considered the largest open-air theater in the world. It has artificial lakes, nine stages, a 3500 m wall and 70 towers.

== History ==
The inception of New Jerusalem dates back to 1951 when Epaminondas Mendonça, a marketer, conceived the idea of reenacting Jesus's life, death, and resurrection on the streets of Fazenda Nova during Holy Week.

Inspired by Passion plays, Mendonça sought to bring a similar event to his community, adding plays.

The theater was completed in 1968, with Plínio Pacheco serving as its Director until his passing in 2002.

== Events ==
=== Passion of Christ ===
Every evening on Holy Week, New Jerusalem hosts a reenactment of Jesus's final days, for approximately two hours.

Spectators journeyed through nine permanent stages, crafting for the event, as they trace the footsteps of Jesus and his disciples through rural Pernambuco. The production showcases 60 actors, including many from Rede Globo.

This happened alongside over 500 supporting actors, portraying the narrative of Jesus's crucifixion and resurrection.

Due to the importance of digital connectivity, the New Jerusalem Theater has embraced online platforms to reach a broader audience and enhance engagement beyond the physical confines of the venue. This includes live streaming of performances, virtual tours, and interactive content, allowing individuals from around the world to experience the Passion of Christ reenactments remotely.

New Jerusalem's annual performance has many people. The theater set a record audience in 2008, welcoming many spectators from 23 Brazilian states and 11 countries.

=== Stages and Scenes ===
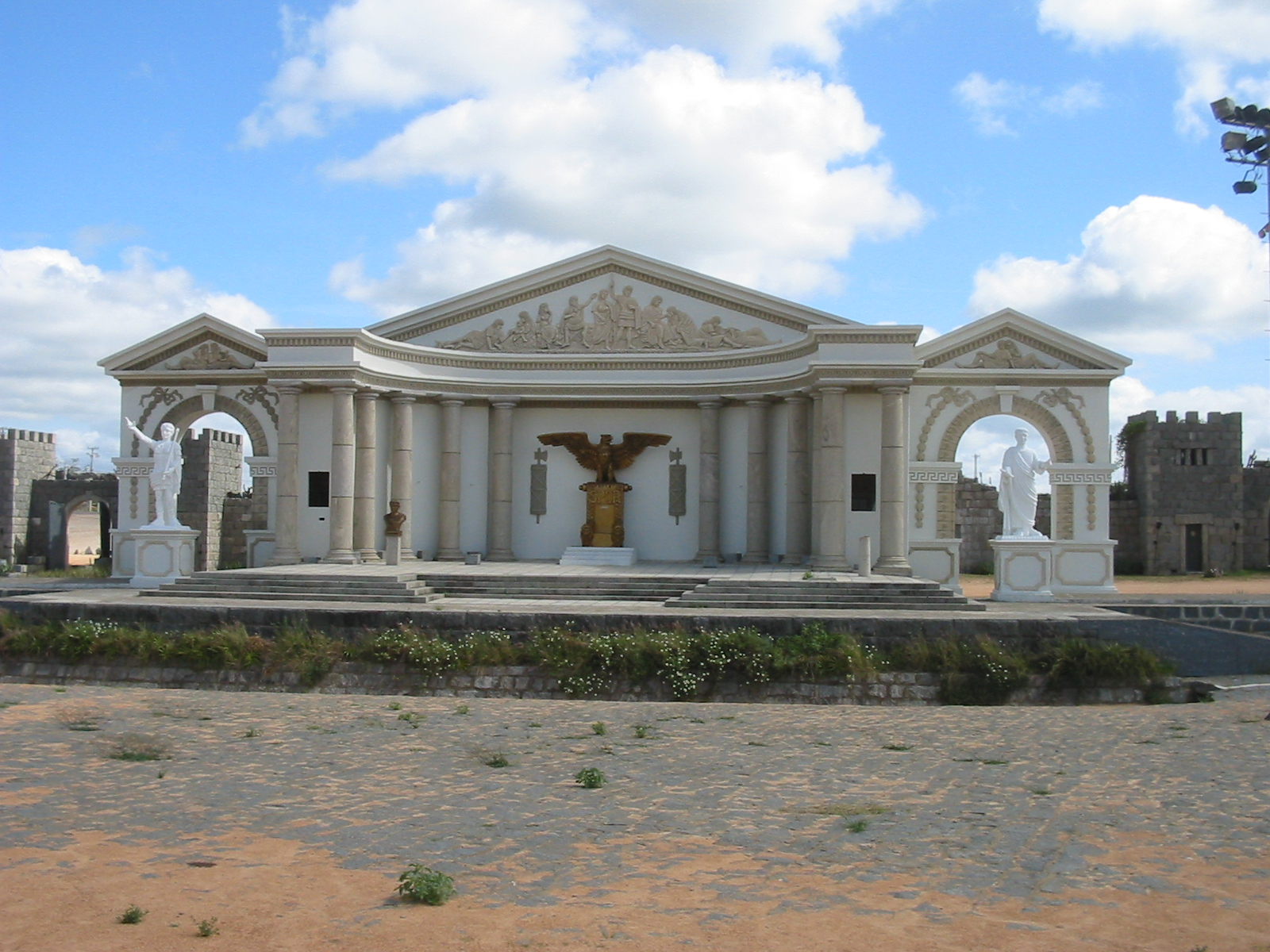
Roman Forum - stage 6

- 1 - Sermon (Prologue, Temptation in the desert and Sermon on the Mount scenes)
- 2 - Jerusalem Temple (Discussions in the Temple and the Supreme Council)
- 3 - The Upper Room (The Last Supper/dinner)
- 4 - The Garden (Agony in the garden, Judas’s betrayal and the Arrest of Jesus)
- 5 - Herod’s Palace (Herod's bacchanal/orgy and Jesus against Herod)
- 6 - Roman Forum (Pilate against Jesus, the Scourging and Condemnation of Jesus)
- 7 - Via Sacra (Meeting with Mary, Women of Lamentations, and The Cirino)
- 8 - Calvary (Despair of Judas, Crucifixion and death on the cross, the descent of the cross and Mater painful)
- 9 - Sepulchre (The burial, Resurrection, Three Marias (Mary's), Angel of resurrection and Ascension of Jesus)
