= The Promise (musical) =

- Original Show Poster
- Music: Gary Rhodes and various
- Lyrics: Various
- Book: Jan Dargatz (with additional dialogue and Music by Chuck King in the Glen Rose production)
- Basis: The Bible
- Productions: 1989-Present Glen Rose, TX and Willow Park, TX, 1996-2002 Branson, MO

The Promise is a musical drama with a book by Jan Dargatz (with additional dialogue by Chuck King) and lyrics and music by various songwriters (several arranged by Gary Rhodes and also by current Director Chuck King) based on biblical texts. The musical follows the life of Jesus Christ, including his birth, life, death, burial, resurrection, and ascension. The musical score is in the style of Christian pop music.

The piece was originally performed outdoors and originated in 1989 in Glen Rose, Texas, where it was performed on a large scale each year until Somervell County sold the amphitheater and the production was forced to look for a new location. The Promise is currently performed in Willow Park, Texas in the auditorium of Willow Park Baptist Church. The work has enjoyed a number of other productions in the United States and around the world.

== Background ==
Outdoor religious dramas such as passion plays have a long tradition. In 1633, the residents of Oberammergau, Germany vowed to continue presenting their local passion play every ten years as a vow to God in return for being spared from the plague. The United States has had passion plays for over three quarters of a century. These have included The Black Hills Passion Play in Spearfish, South Dakota and The Great Passion Play in Eureka Springs, Arkansas.

In 1984, Dargatz and Rhodes began to develop The Promise in cooperation with Word Music, Inc. and Kingdom Development Company, making way for a new type of passion play that effectively blended Christian popular music with the timeless story of the gospel of Jesus Christ.

== Production history ==
This original version of The Promise opened in November 1989 in Glen Rose, Texas.

=== The Texas Production ===
With scenic design by Peter Wolf of Dallas, Texas created to take advantage of the rolling hills near Glen Rose as a backdrop, the musical was originally produced outdoors on a large scale each summer at the Texas Amphitheatre and is still performed from September until November annually. The Texas Amphitheater was constructed as a joint venture with Somervell County - the land was donated by The Kingdom Foundation (founders of The Promise), and the county built the amphitheater with The Promise as its featured tenant. The Texas Amphitheater featured a Greco-Roman set with 42-foot (13 m) arches and a six-story archway towering over a 65 x 100-square-foot (9.3 m^{2}) tri-level stage. There are approximately 3,200 units of stadium seating in the amphitheater. A moat separated the stage and the seats, and during the show, the moat was used as a proxy for the Jordan River at times, and the Sea of Galilee at others. It also boasted a rain curtain which adds dramatic effect during the storm scene. The cast exceeds 125 actors and includes live animals such as donkeys, sheep, horses, doves, and camels. In 2015, at the conclusion of the original lease agreement, Somervell County was no longer interested in maintaining the Texas Amphitheater, and had turned most of its attention and resources to the Somervell County Expo. The Promise was able to negotiate a new lease, assuming operational control and responsibility for all maintenance of the facility while the county retained ownership.

In 2017, the narration of the story (as performed in Glen Rose, Texas) was significantly altered to tell the story of Jesus through the eyes of a first-century Jewish family, rather than a grandfather and his grandchildren from modern-day Texas. Additionally, the choice was made to update (or replace) songs that would sound dated to a contemporary audience. Chuck King contributed the majority of the updates to script and music. The first edition of the updated show was subtitled: The Promise: Son of David, but in ensuing years has continued to be billed simply as The Promise. As the show continues, minor edits are often made for each season, and new songs continue to be added (most recently "This is Now," sung by Peter after his betrayal, written by Joshua Lee). Since the beginning of the 2020s, The Promise has expanded its offerings to include The Promise of Passover and The Promise of Christmas. The Promise of Passover, running annually on weekends leading up to Easter, tells the story of Passion Week as narrated by Bartimaeus the blind man. The Promise of Christmas, which runs in December, tells the story of Mary and Joseph, as well as Elizabeth and Zechariah as they await the coming of the Promised One.

In 2024, as long-deferred capital improvements and updates to the Texas Amphitheater became more apparent, The Promise approached Somervell County about purchasing the Amphitheater, and the county commissioners agreed to list it for public bidding. Despite The Promise submitting the only bid, the offer was deemed too low, and the county re-listed the property for sale. During the next bidding period, an investment group outbid The Promise and purchased the facility in November 2024, also purchasing the Expo Center from the county shortly thereafter. Negotiations with the new ownership proved unsuccessful in spring of 2025, and The Promise was forced to seek a new production venue. After pursuing other options, an agreement was reached with Willow Park Baptist Church in Willow Park, Texas to host The Promise's productions through 2027. The 2026 fall season of The Promise in Willow Park will mark the 38th year of The Promise, and the third show at the Willow Park venue. This year's productions are directed by John Wilkerson.

== Synopsis of The Promise (Currently running every Fall season) ==
Based on the 2024 Glen Rose production. Note: Songs labelled with § have been added to the Glen Rose production since the original production.

Prologue

A young shepherd boy, Reuben, appears looking frantically for his sheep and encounters Chaya the shepherdess who tells him of David tending flocks in the same fields. She assists him in finding his sheep through song ("Psalm 23")

Act I

A mother and daughter, Tirzah and Abigail, prepare dinner for father and son, Reuben and Ephram, who are returning from a long day tending their herds in the fields, while the young boy Caleb rests on a bed, he is crippled. After family greetings and excited talk of the upcoming Passover the mealtime prayer and Sabbath evokes questions about Gods covenant and Reuben explains its like a promise. Like the promise God made to send the Messiah. ("A Promise Is a Promise")

The lighting then shifts to revel on the main stage the prophets of the Old Testament, who are foretelling the coming of Christ. Reuben continues to narrate the telling of the story from the family home in a small upper room located off the main stage that is illuminated only during those parts. The Archangel Gabriel announces the birth of baby Jesus, and shepherds and three Magi travel to Bethlehem to worship Him ("Saviour"). At this point the Nativity is revealed Mary, Joseph and the baby Jesus in the manger ("Son of God"§). The townspeople and children gather singing their praise to the newborn king. Reuben rushes to confirm the saviours arrival.

Reuben explains to the children that Herod decreed that all male babies in Bethlehem under the age of two must be massacred, but just in time, an angel warned Joseph to flee to Egypt with baby Jesus. After Herod dies, the angel directs them back to Nazareth, where Jesus grows up but it is not long before his parents find him teaching in the Temple. ("Sh'ma Israel"§)

Jesus grows up, and his cousin, John the Baptist, calls for sinners to repent and be baptized in the Jordan River ("The Kingdom of Heaven/One Voice"§). Jesus comes to John to be baptized, and though John bows before Jesus and insists that it is not right for him to baptize Jesus, Jesus asks him to permit it so they may do what is right in God's eyes. John baptizes Jesus, and the Spirit of God descends on him. Satan leads Jesus out into the wilderness and tempts him, but Jesus does not succumb to his temptation ("It is Written"§). Back in Galilee, Jesus calls four fishermen – Peter, James, John, and Andrew – to be his first disciples. Amazed by a miraculous catch of fish, they declare that he must be the coming king ("Fishers of Men"§).

Jesus calls twelve disciples and begins teaching the common people the Beatitudes, explaining his love for them ("Come Unto Me"§). Caiaphas and the Pharisees enter and accuse Jesus of being a false Messiah and of blasphemy for violating the sabbath. As they leave the crowd ask Jesus to teach them how to pray and he does (The Lords Prayer"§).

Jesus meets with Nicodemus and explains to him that to enter heaven one must be born again. He teaches him the meaning of redemption through repentance. In the next scene The apostles sing and dance, telling the crowds "He Is Jehovah" but as they cross the Jordan a great storm suddenly sets in and they fear they will perish and call out to Jesus who calms the sea.

Jesus heals the blind, A woman with the issue of blood("The hem of his garment"§), Ruben's lame son, casts the demons out from a man and raises a child from the dead in the marketplace . ("Hem of his garment" (reprise)).

Act II

Jesus and his disciples make his Triumphal Entry into Jerusalem as the crowds celebrate and lay palm branches before him ("Hoshianah"§). When Jesus arrives at the Temple, he finds money changers selling animals for temple sacrifices, turning the Temple into a place of business. He angrily overturns their tables and confronts Caiaphas, the High priest ("My Father's Temple"§).

Jesus and His disciples meet in an upper room to celebrate the Passover, and he gives them some of his final teachings, assuring them that His spirit and His peace will always be with them ("Shalom"). Judas leaves the table to betray Jesus to the priests and Pharisees. Jesus predicts that all his disciples will fall away, but Peter insists that he will never leave Jesus. Jesus warns him that before the rooster crows, he will deny Jesus three times. Jesus and the rest of His disciples go into the Garden of Gethsemane to pray ("He Is Jehovah" (reprise)). The disciples fall asleep. Jesus begs God to take away the suffering he will endure, but then asks that God's will be done so that God may be glorified ("Glorify Your Son"§). The disciples awaken as Judas returns with some Roman soldiers. Judas betrays Jesus with a kiss, and the soldiers arrest him and lead him away.

As Jesus is awaiting His trial, three people recognize Peter as one of Jesus' followers. Peter repeatedly denies even knowing Jesus, and a rooster crows. Peter is overcome by his guilt and asks God for forgiveness, dedicating his life to God ("This is Now"§). Jesus is put on trial before Herod and then Pontius Pilate, who initially refuses to condemn Him, since He had committed no crime. During these trials, Jesus is whipped, and a crown of thorns is placed on his head. An angry mob insists that Pilate "Let Him Be Crucified", and Pilate turns him over to the rioters and the Roman soldiers. The soldiers lead him along the "Via Dolorosa" to Calvary, a hill outside the city, to be crucified. The soldiers beat and mock Jesus as he carries his cross, while his followers mourn. Jesus is nailed to the cross, and the soldiers cast lots for his robe ("Cross of Calvary"). Jesus tells his mother, Mary, that the apostle John is now her son. He cries out to God, "Abba, Father, why have you forsaken me?" and then gasps, "it is finished."

Joseph of Arimathea and Nicodemus, religious leaders and secret followers of Jesus, take his body down from the cross and bury it in the tomb that Joseph had purchased for himself. Pilate posts Roman guards at the tomb so Jesus' apostles will not be able to steal Jesus' body and claim that He rose from the dead. On Sunday, the Angel Gabriel appears at the tomb, singing God's command for Jesus to "Arise". Three women arrive at the tomb to mourn and find Jesus there, risen from the dead! They bring the apostles to Him, and all the people come to worship Jesus.

Reuben explains that Jesus is still alive today and urges everyone to go forth to fulfill His Great Commission. Everyone joins in singing "Glory to God" and "Magnify".

== Musical numbers ==
Note: Songs labelled with § have been added to the Glen Rose production since the original production.

Act I

- "Overture" (arr. Gary Rhodes) - includes "A Promise is a Promise", "I See the Kingdom Coming", "Glory to God", and "Arise"
- "A Promise Is a Promise" (music & lyrics by Walt Harrah) – Grandfather, Lisa, Jeremiah, Isaiah, Micah, Zechariah
- "Magnify" (music & lyrics by Luke Garrett) – Young Mary, Joseph, Lisa
- "Glory to God" (music & lyrics by Harrah, arr. by David T. Clydesdale) – Angel Gabriel, Chorus
- "Little Yeshua" (music & lyrics by Gary Rhodes, arr. by Mark Hayes) – Joseph, Twelve-year-old Jesus
- "The Kingdom of Heaven" (music & lyrics by Robert Sterling) - John the Baptist, Chorus §
- "One Voice" (music & lyrics by Sterling - John the Baptist, Chorus §
- "It Is Written" (music & lyrics by Steve Amerson and David T. Clydesdale) - Jesus, Satan §
- "I See the Kingdom Coming" (music & lyrics by Don Marsh) – Peter, James, John, Matthew, Apostles
- "Closer Than a Heartbeat" (music & lyrics by Claire Cloninger and Marsh) – Jesus §
- "He Is Jehovah" (music & lyrics by Betty Jean Robinson, arr. by Rhodes) – Apostles, Chorus
- "In the Name of the Lord" (music by Sandi Patti Helvering, lyrics by Phill McHugh, Gloria Gaither and Helvering, arr. by Marsh) – Soloist and Chorus
- "In the Name of the Lord (reprise)" (music by Helvering, lyrics by McHugh, Gaither and Helvering, arr. by Marsh) – Soloist and Chorus

Act 2

- "We Cry Hosanna, Lord" (music by Mimi Farra, lyrics by Farra and Cloninger, arr. by Rhodes) – Chorus

- "Hosanna" (music & lyrics by Sandi Patti) will replace "We Cry Hosanna, Lord" in the 2012 Glen Rose production and will be sung by three Soloists and Chorus. §

- "My Father's Temple" (music & lyrics by Jan Easterline and David T. Clydesdale) - Jesus §
- "Shalom" (music by Marsh and Cloninger, lyrics by Cloninger) – Jesus, Chorus
- "He Is Jehovah (reprise)" (music & lyrics by Robinson, arr. by Rhodes) – Apostles
- "Glorify Your Son" (music & lyrics by Amerson and Clydesdale) – Jesus, Chorus §
- "Peter's Song" (music & lyrics by Rodger Strader) – Peter §
- Crucifixion Medley:

- "Let Him Be Crucified" (music & lyrics by Clydesdale) – Pilate, Chorus
- "Via Dolorosa" (music & lyrics by Billy Sprague and Niles Borop, arr. by Ken Barker) – Grandpa, Chorus
- "Cross of Calvary" (music by Don and Lorie Marsh, lyrics by Cloninger, arr. by Rhodes) – Mary at the Cross, John, Chorus

- "Arise" (music by Kathy Frizzell, lyrics by Cloninger, arr. by Rhodes) - Angel, Chorus
- "Finale" (arr. Rhodes) – Company

== Dramatic analysis (Original Production, 1989-2017) ==
The Promise's fundamental design is that Grandpa tells his grandchildren about Jesus' life, and the events "come to life" on stage as he tells the story. The musical begins with just Grandpa, Billy, and Lisa, hiking in modern times. As Grandpa and Lisa begin to sing "A Promise is a Promise", Biblical prophets appear behind them, proclaiming Jesus' coming. Billy is the only one who can see the Biblical characters at this time. Billy and Lisa persuade Grandpa to tell them "the whole story" about Jesus as they rest from their hiking. They sit and rest in area of the stage designated as the "firepit" in the original script; this area is very far downstage on one side of the stage, as not to obscure the action farther upstage. The "firepit" and the action there are implied to exist in modern times, while the rest of the stage is where the Biblical story takes place. Grandpa serves as a narrator for the musical; as he describes the events of Jesus' life, they occur onstage behind him. The story maintains continuity through this device; Grandpa's narration "fills the gaps" between scenes in Jesus' life.

The distinction between the present and Biblical times is not strictly observed; the three modern characters sometimes interact with the Biblical characters, but they return to their bench by the firepit at the end of each scene. This is not a dramatic oversight; rather, it is intended to emphasize the humanity of Biblical figures. Notable instances include when Grandpa, Lisa, and Billy meet Mary and Joseph as they journey to Bethlehem (this is the first time Grandpa and Lisa "see" the Biblical characters), and Lisa and Mary have a brief duet in the middle of "Magnify". Peter, Andrew, and John have a short scene in which they are warming their hands by the firepit and discussing Jesus' death. When Jesus is carrying his cross to Calvary, he cannot carry it all the way up the hill, so Grandpa pulls it the rest of the way (In the Biblical account, the soldiers ordered a passing man, Simon of Cyrene, to carry Jesus' cross).

== Other productions ==
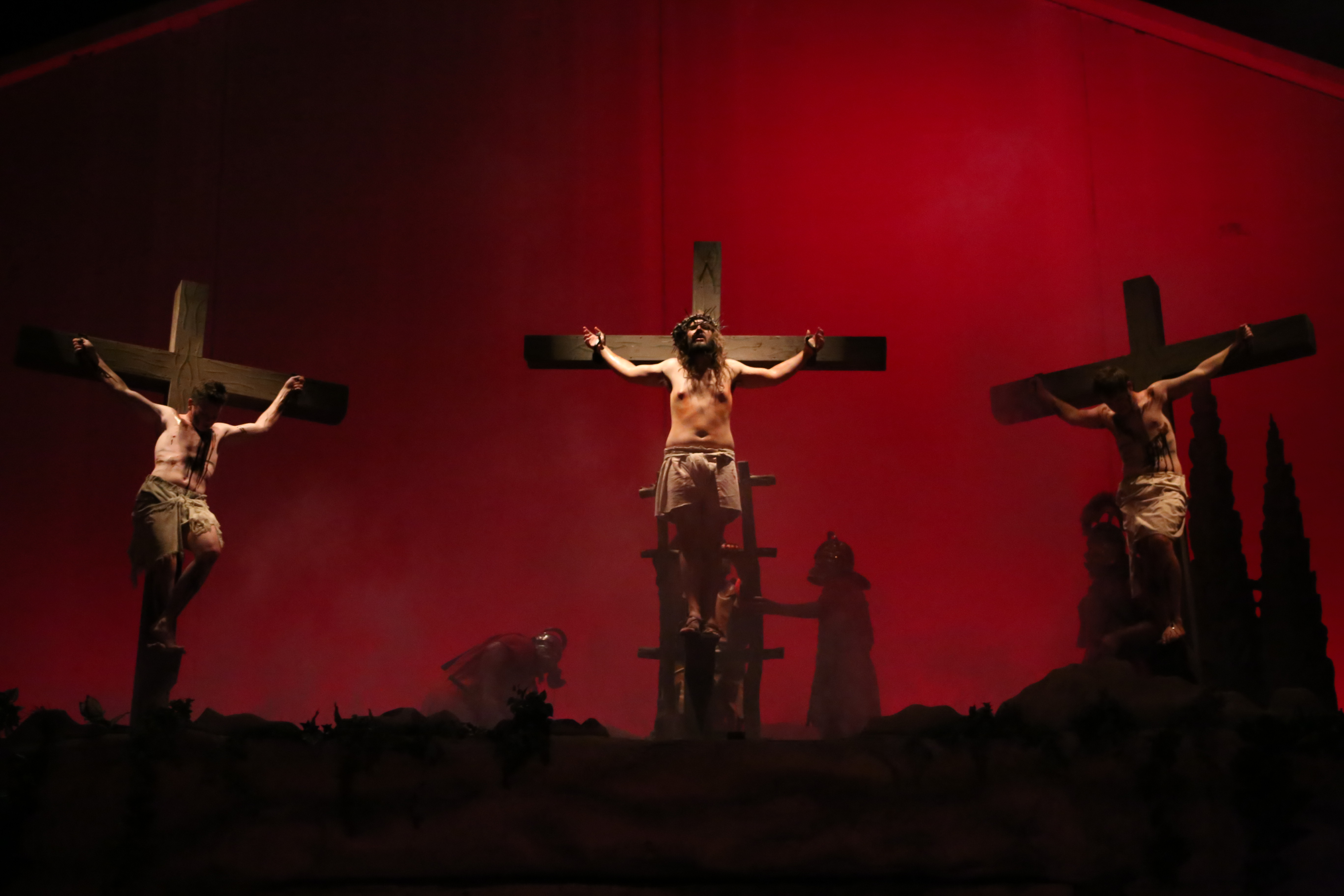
Crucifixion scene during the 2019 production of The Promise at the Texas Amphitheatre.

In 1993, The Promise became the first Christian production to be allowed into the former Soviet Union. In 1994, The Promise returned to the Kremlin State Palace for a tour of encore performances.

From 1990 to 2012, Lighthouse Christian Church's Impact Productions in Fond du Lac, WI performed The Promise during Holy Week with breaks in 1995, 2006, and 2009. Beginning in 2000, the show was merged with another production by David T. Clydesdale, The Power of His Love, and the production was entitled The Promise: The Power of His Love. This new production's first act consisted primarily of The Promise, whereas the second act was taken primarily from The Power of His Love. Many production changes occurred over the years as the shows were combined. The most significant of changes included replacing the character of Grandpa with a Narrator and the complete removal of Billy and Lisa. Numerous songs were introduced as well, including Michael W. Smith's All Is Well from his album, Christmas. The cast and crew was entirely made up of members of the congregation with 3 men having portrayed Christ during the production's run. Lighthouse Christian Church never charged an admission price as The Promise was always considered "a gift to the community". It is estimated that over 50,000 people had seen the show over the 22-year span.

Since 1990 The Promise was performed at Queensway Cathedral in Toronto, Ontario, and was known locally as the Toronto Passion Play. It was by far the largest production of the play to take place in Southern Ontario, boasting a cast and crew of over 400. Queen Elizabeth II attended the 2004 performance.

The Promise was performed for 11 years in the small rural community of Forest, Ontario, Canada, in southwestern Ontario. That production played on three weekends in each July/August from 1995 to 2005. The Promise will be returning for its 12th season in August 2010, and will be performed again in 2013 on July 5,6,7th and 12, 13, 14th. produced by Forest Community Theatre.|date=June 2013 Since 1992, The Promise has been performed annually in Litchfield, Illinois at Zion Lutheran Church and School. The production is performed on the two weekends before Palm Sunday every spring.

In 1996, The Promise played at the Will Rogers Theatre in Branson, Missouri, beginning year-round performances in that city. That production continued seasonally through 2002. The Promise was performed at The Mansion Theatre in Branson through 2008.

The Promise has been produced internationally in Seoul, Korea, at the Olympic Stadium, and in South Africa, as well as other countries around the world. Other productions in the U.S. include one in New York City.

The Promise was staged in the University Cultural Centre in the National University of Singapore from 27 to 29 November 2008.

Beginning in 2014, Bethel Gospel Tabernacle in Hamilton, Ontario, began staging the production. The production has been staged in 2014, 2015, 2017, 2018 and 2019.

Since 1992, The Promise has been staged roughly every other year by Northwest Baptist Church in Reisterstown, Maryland, on the weekends of Palm Sunday and Easter. It grew from a modest-sized production by church members to now include over 100 cast and crew from the local community and several churches. Over the years, many updates and changes to the script have taken place but the core story remains the same. A number of locals have made it a tradition to see it each year it's staged and look forward to the updates, some having been coming to shows for as long as the past 20 years.

Starting in 1992, The Promise was performed in Litchfield, Illinois under the organization Contemporary Christian Music Ministry. Yearly performances were held for two weekends, seven and later only six total performances, shortly before Easter. Performances continued for 24 straight years (though a counting error caused us to celebrate our "25th and Final Season" in 2015), in the same location, Zion Lutheran Church and School.

Trace Creek Baptist Church in Mayfield, Kentucky has performed The Promise since the year 2000 (with the exceptions of the 2020 and 2021 seasons due to COVID-19). Trace Creek utilizes a cast and crew of over 400 people, and the 2022 season saw seven performances with more than 6,500 people in attendance. After overwhelming demand, the 2023 season added an eighth performance.
