= Quem quaeritis? =

Latin question in the medieval Easter liturgy

The Latin question Quem quaeritis? (Latin for "Whom do you seek?") refers to four lines of the medieval Easter liturgy that later formed the kernel of the large body of medieval liturgical drama, which is also known as Visitatio sepulchri ("Visit to the tomb"). It was introduced into the liturgy in the tenth century, as a new genre of liturgical ceremony:

Interrogatio. Quem quaeritis in sepulchro, o Christicolae?
Responsio. Jesum Nazarenum crucifixum, o caelicolae.
Angeli. Non est hic; surrexit, sicut praedixerat. Ite, nuntiate quia surrexit de sepulchro

Translation:

Question [by the Angels]: Whom do ye seek in the sepulchre, O followers of Christ?
Answer [by the Marys]: Jesus of Nazareth, the Crucified, O heavenly ones.
The Angels: He is not here; he is risen, just as he foretold. Go, announce that he is risen from the sepulchre.
—John Gassner, editor, Medieval and Tudor Drama

The lines were then followed by a sung chorus of Alleluias.

The Quem Quaeritis? was an exchange of one question, one answer, and one command between the Angels at Christ's tomb and the three Marys, the Virgin Mary, Mary Magdalene, and Mary, the sister of Lazarus. The specific question "Quem quaeritis?" "Whom do you seek?" is not in fact in Luke 24, where it is implied but omitted: "Why seek ye the living among the dead? He is not here, but is risen". The actual question is directly expressed in John 18:7 under a different context: "Iterum ergo interrogavit eos: Quem quæritis? Illi autem dixerunt: Jesum Nazarenum."

In the canonical gospels it is Mary Magdalene, Joanna, Mary (the mother of James), and "other women" who were present at this event.

Although short, this excerpt of text would later snowball into a huge body of religious medieval plays, and evolve into various genres, such as liturgical drama and mystery plays. The plays that can trace their genealogy to the Quem Quaeritis? lasted for about 650 years, until the end of the Protestant Reformation.
