= Easter Drama =

An Easter Drama is a liturgical drama or religious theatrical performance in the Roman Catholic tradition, largely limited to the Middle Ages. These performances evolved from celebrations of the liturgy to incorporate later dramatic and secular elements, and came to be performed in local languages. They were succeeded by the Passion Plays.

== Liturgical origins ==
In the Middle Ages, the celebration of liturgical feasts was as rich and varied as they were numerous; poetry and music, in particular, were used to impress on the congregation the significance of the events commemorated. Liturgical worship is in itself dramatic, with its stylized dialogues and the use of choirs. Often, as at Christmas, Epiphany, and Easter, the text of the Gospel called for a variety of roles. The Benedictines of St. Gallen, in Switzerland, in the 10th century wrote sequences, hymns, litanies, and tropes and set them to music. The tropes—elaborations of parts of the Liturgy, particularly the Introit—found universal acceptance and remained in use in various forms until the end of the 17th century. These tropes were dramatic in construction and, as their musical settings prove, were sung alternately by two choirs of men and boys, or by two half-choirs. The history of the ecclesiastical drama begins with the trope sung as Introit of the Mass on Easter Sunday. It has come down to us in a St. Gallen manuscript dating from the time of the 10th century monk Tutilo.

The conversation held between the holy women and the angels at Christ's sepulchre forms the text of this trope, which consists of the four sentences:

Quem quaeritis in sepulchro, o christicolae
Jesum Nazarenum, o coelicolae
Non est hic. Surrexit, sicut praedixerat.
Ite nuntiate quia surrexit de sepulchro.
Resurrexi, postquam factus homo, tua jussa paterna peregi.

Also known as the Quem quaeritis?, the first three sentences are found in many liturgical books dating from the 10th to the 18th century. The trope, however, did not develop into a dramatic scene until it was brought into connection with the Descent from the Cross. It was widely commemorated in Continental monasteries, but appears first in a ritual of English origin, attributed to St. Dunstan (967). In giving directions for public services, the Ritual refers to this custom particularly as observed at Fleury-sur-Loire and Ghent. On Good Friday, after the morning services, a crucifix swathed in cloth was laid in a sort of grave arranged near the altar, where it remained until Easter morning. On Easter morning, after the third responsory of the Matins, one or two clerics clothed in albs, and carrying palms in their hands, went to the grave and seated themselves there. Thereupon three other priests vested in copes, and carrying censers representing the three holy women, joined them. Upon their arrival the "angel" asked them: "Whom seek ye?" The "women" answered; they hear from the "angel" the message of the Resurrection and were told to go forth and announce it. Then they intoned the antiphon: "Surrexit enim, sicut dixit dominus. Alleluia". The choir finished Matins with the Te Deum.

This simplest form of liturgical Easter celebration was elaborated in many ways by the addition of Biblical sentences, hymns, and sequences, in particular the "Victimae paschali", which dates from the first half of the 11th century; also by the representation of St. Peter and St. John running to the grave, and by the appearance of Jesus, who thenceforth becomes the central figure. The union of these scenes in one concerted action (the dialogue), rendered in poetic form (hymns, sequences) or in prose (Bible texts), and the participation of a choir gave to the Nuremberg Easter celebration of the 13th century the character of a short chanted drama. Such celebrations, however, remained parts of the liturgy as late as the 18th century. They were inserted between Matins and Lauds, and served for the instruction of the people, whose hearts and minds were more deeply impressed by reproductions of the Resurrection of Jesus, which appealed to the senses, than by a sermon. The Latin text was no obstacle, since the separate parts of the plays were known or were previously explained. The wide diffusion of these liturgical plays, in which priests took the different parts, is proof of their popularity. At least 224 Latin Easter dramas are known to have existed, of which 159 were found in Germany, 52 in France, and the rest in Italy, Spain, Holland, and England.

== Development into drama ==
The popular taste for dramatic productions was fed by these Easter celebrations. The clergy emphasized more and more the dramatic moments, often merely hinted at in the rude original celebrations, and added new subjects, among them some of a secular nature. They introduced the characters of Pontius Pilate, the Jews, and the soldiers guarding the sepulchre, added the figure of an ointment-vender bargaining with the holy women, and other features which did not contribute to the edification or instruction of the people, though they satisfied their love of novelty and amusement. In this way the early Easter celebrations became real dramatic performances, known as the Easter Plays. Since the element of worldly amusement predominated more and more (a development of which Gerhoh of Reichersberg complained as early as the 12th century), the ecclesiastical authorities began to prohibit the production of Easter Plays in the churches. It became necessary to separate them from church services, because of their length, which increased greatly, particularly after the introduction of the story of the Passion.

Fragments of an Easter Play in Latin dating from the 13th century are found in the Benedictbeurn Easter Play, also in that of Klosterneuburg, both of which, probably, go back to the same source as the Mystery of Tours, composed as late as the 12th century, and which, better than any other, offers an insight into the development of the Easter Plays from the Latin Easter celebrations.

== Popularization ==
When, in course of time, as shown in the Easter Play of Trier, German translations were added to the original texts as sung and spoken, the popularizing of the Easter Play had begun. That of Muri Abbey, in Switzerland, belongs to this period, and is written entirely in German. But it was only after the popular element had asserted itself strongly in all departments of poetry, in the 14th and 15th centuries, that the popular German religious drama was developed. This was brought about chiefly by the strolling players who were certainly responsible for the introduction of the servant, of the ointment-vender (named Rubin), whose duty it was to entertain the people with coarse jests (Wolfenbüttel, Innsbruck, Berlin, Vienna, and Mecklenburg Easter Plays, 1464). The Latin Easter Plays, with their solemn texts, were still produced, as well as the German plays, but gradually, being displaced by the latter, the Latin text was confined to the meagre Biblical element of the plays and the player's directions. The clergy still retained the right to direct these productions, even after the plays reflected the spirit and opinions of the times. Popular poetry, gross and worldly, dominated in the plays, particularly susceptible to the influence of the Carnival plays.

== Passion Plays ==
The Easter Plays represented in their day the highest development of the secular drama; nevertheless this most important event in the life of Jesus did not suffice: the people wished to see his whole life, particularly the story of the Passion. Thus a series of dramas originated, which were called Passion Plays, the sufferings of Jesus being their principal subject. Some of them end with the entombment of Christ; in others the Easter Play was added, in order to show the Saviour in His glory; others again close with the Ascension or with the dispersion of the Apostles. But, since the persecution of the Saviour is intelligible only in the light of His work as teacher, this part of the life of Christ was also added, while some authors of these plays went back to the Old Testament for symbolical scenes, which they added to the Passion Plays as "prefigurations"; or the plays begin with the Creation, the sin of Adam and Eve, and the fall of the Angels.

Again two short dramas were inserted: the Lament of Mary and the Mary Magdalene Play. The sequence "Planctus ante nescia", which was brought to Germany from France during the latter half of the 12th century, is the basis for the Lamentations of Mary. This sequence is merely a monologue of Mary at the foot of the Cross; by the introduction of John, the Saviour, and the bystanders as taking part in the lamentations, a dramatic scene was developed which became a part of almost all Passion Plays and has been retained even in their latest survivor. The Magdalene Play represents the seduction of Mary Magdalene by the devil and her sinful life up to her conversion. In Magdalene's sinfulness the people saw a picture of the depraved condition of mankind after the sin of the Garden of Eden, from which it could be redeemed only through the sacrifice of Christ. This profound thought, which could not be effaced even by the coarse reproduction of Magdalene's life, explains the presence of this little drama in the Passion Play.
