= Karl Ernst Georges =

German classical philologist (1806–1895)

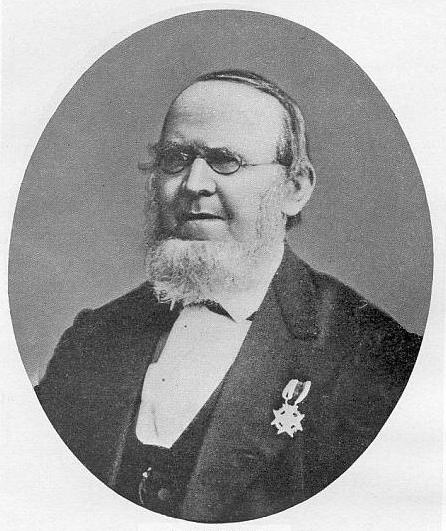
Karl Ernst Georges

Karl Ernst Georges (German pronunciation: [ɡeˈɔʁɡəs]; 26 December 1806, Gotha – 25 August 1895, Gotha) was a German classical philologist and lexicographer, known for his edition of Latin-German dictionaries.

From 1826 to 1828 he studied classical philology at the University of Göttingen as a pupil of Karl Otfried Müller and Georg Ludolf Dissen, then continued his education at Leipzig. In 1828 he was employed by the Hahn'schen Verlagsbuchhandlung under the direction of Georg Heinrich Lünemann to assist in revising a new edition of Scheller's Latin-German lexicon. He completed work on the lexicon in 1833 (Lünemann had died in 1830) and it was accepted at the University of Jena in lieu of a dissertation for his doctorate degree. In 1837 Georges published a new edition of the Latin-German lexicon under his own name.

From 1839 to 1856 he worked as a senior instructor at the Realgymnasium and the Ernestine Gymnasium in Gotha. Due to failing eyesight, he retired from teaching and devoted his time to lexicographical work.

== Published works ==
- (in German) Ausführliches lateinisch-deutsches Handwörterbuch (8th edition, 2 volumes 1913-18; revised and enlarged by his son, Heinrich Georges) – Detailed Latin-German dictionary.
- (in German) Kleines deutsch-lateinisches Handwörterbuch (7th edition, 1910; revised and enlarged by Heinrich Georges) – Small German-Latin dictionary.
- "A copious and critical English-Latin lexicon : founded on the German-Latin dictionary of Dr. Charles Ernest Georges", 1849 by Rev. Joseph Esmond Riddle and Rev. Thomas Kerchever Arnold.
- (in German) Thesaurus der klassischen Latinität, 1854-68 (2 volumes) – Thesaurus of classical Latin.
- (in German) Ausführliches lateinisch-deutsches und deutsch-lateinisches Handwörterbuch, (1869, 7th edition 1879-82).
- (in German) Lateinisch-Deutsches Schulwörterbuch zu Terentius, Cicero, Caesar, Sallustius, etc., 1876 – Latin-German dictionary of Terence, Cicero, Julius Caesar, Sallust, et al.
- (in German) Lexikon der lateinischen Wortformen, 1890 – Lexicon of Latin word forms.
