= Maenianum =

A maenianum was a balcony or gallery for spectators at a public show in ancient Rome. The name was originally given by censor Gaius Maenius in 318 BC to the decorated gallery in the Forum Romanum, where spectators watched gladiatorial combats.

The maenianum was divided into several levels: maenianum primum, which was reserved for the non-senatorial noble class called the equites. The maenianum secundum, which featured the better, lower seats for the wealthy plebeians; and maenianum summum with the upper seats for the poor plebeians.

== Literature ==
- Maenius. In: Karl Ernst Georges: Concise Latin-German pocket dictionary. 8th edition. Volume 2, Hannover 1918, Sp. 755 (online).
- KIP | 3 | 864 ||| Walter Hatto Gross
- Philip Smith: maenianum. In: William Smith: . A Dictionary of Greek and Roman Antiquities John Murray, London, 1875. 723 S. (E / novel / text / secondary / SMIGRA * /).
