= Georg Heinrich Lünemann =

German classical philologist and lexicographer

Georg Heinrich Lünemann (3 September 1780, in Göttingen – 8 January 1830, in Göttingen) was a German classical philologist and lexicographer. His younger brother, Johann Heinrich Christian Lünemann (1787–1827), was also a classical philologist.

He studied classical philology at the University of Göttingen, and in 1803 succeeded Georg Friedrich Grotefend as an instructor of Greek and Latin at the gymnasium in Göttingen. He is best known for his revised editions of Immanuel Johann Gerhard Scheller's Latin dictionaries. He also published numerous editions of classical authors for classroom purposes; its authors including: Horace (1818), Virgil (1818), Phaedrus with Avianus, Publilius Syrus and Dionysius Cato (1823), Sallust (1825), Tacitus (1825) and Curtius Rufus (1827).

== Selected works ==
- Descriptio Caucasi gentiumque Caucasiarum ex Strabone, comparatis scriptoribus recentioribus, 1803.
- Lateinisch-deutsches und deutsch-lateinisches Handlexikon (5th edition, 1822, 6th edition 1826 / initial author: Immanuel Johann Gerhard Scheller) – Latin-German and German-Latin "hand lexicon".
- Imman. Joh. Gerh. Scheller's kleines lateinisches Wörterbuch (5th edition, 1816) – Small Latin dictionary.
- Epistolae Ad Atticum, Ad Quintum Fratrem, Et Quae Vulgo Ad Familiares Dicuntur (edition of Cicero) 4 volumes, 1820-22.
- M. Fabii Quintiliani de institutione oratoria libri duodecim (edition of Quintilian), 1826.

Also, he made contributions to the index of mycologist Christiaan Hendrik Persoon's Synopsis methodica fungorum.
