= Immanuel Johann Gerhard Scheller =

German classical philologist and lexicographer

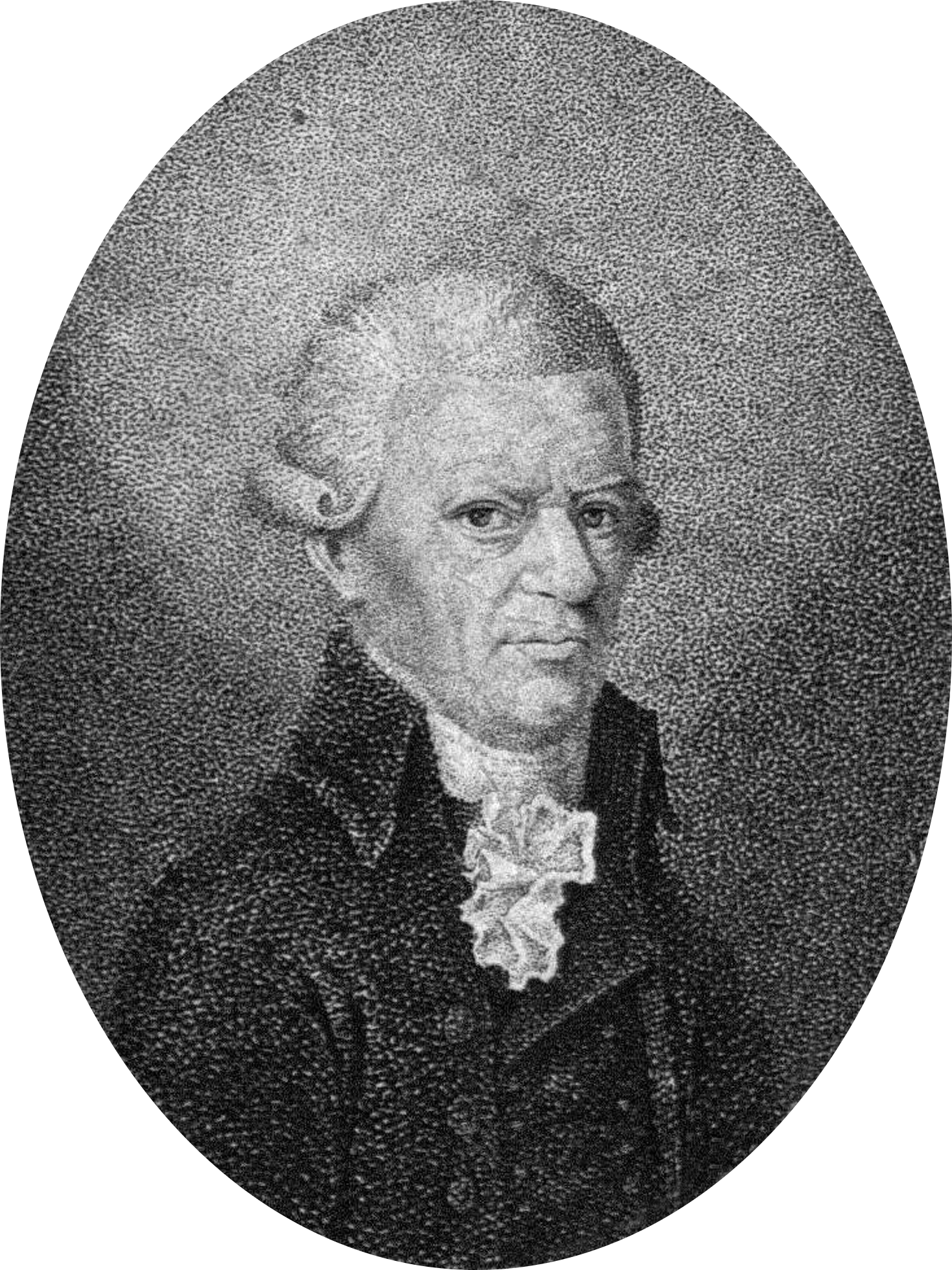
Immanuel Johann Gerhard Scheller

Immanuel Johann Gerhard Scheller (22 March 1735, in Ihlow – 5 July 1803, in Brieg) was a German classical philologist and lexicographer.

From 1757 he studied theology and classical philology at the University of Leipzig, and following graduation, began work as rector at the lyceum in Lübben (1761). In 1771, by way of a suggestion from Karl Abraham Zedlitz, he relocated to Brieg as a professor and rector of its royal grammar school. Here he remained until his death in 1803.

He is remembered for his important work as a lexicographer of Latin dictionaries, his aim being, to present the lexicon of the ancient authors as it developed historically. In 1783 he published a two-volume detailed Latin-German dictionary; its second edition in 1788 was expanded to three volumes, and the third edition, issued a year after his death (1804), was published in five volumes. In 1792 he published a "concise" Handlexicon, which after his death was issued over several revisions by Georg Heinrich Lünemann.

== Selected works ==
- Kleines lateinisches Wörterbuch worin die bekanntesten Wörter verzeichnet, etc. 1779 – Small Latin dictionary.
- Ausführliches und möglichst vollständiges deutsch-lateinisches Lexicon oder Wörterbuch, (2nd edition, 1788) – Detailed German-Latin lexicon.
- Lateinisch-deutsches und deutsch-lateinisches Handlexicon, 1792 – Latin-German and German-Latin hand lexicon.
- "Lexicon totius latinitatis : a dictionary of the Latin language", 1835 by Joseph Esmond Riddle, an English translation of Imman. Joh. Gerhard Schellers ausführliches und möglichst vollständiges lateinisch-deutsches Lexicon oder Wörterbuch.
