= Charles Anthon =

American classical scholar and educator (1797–1867)

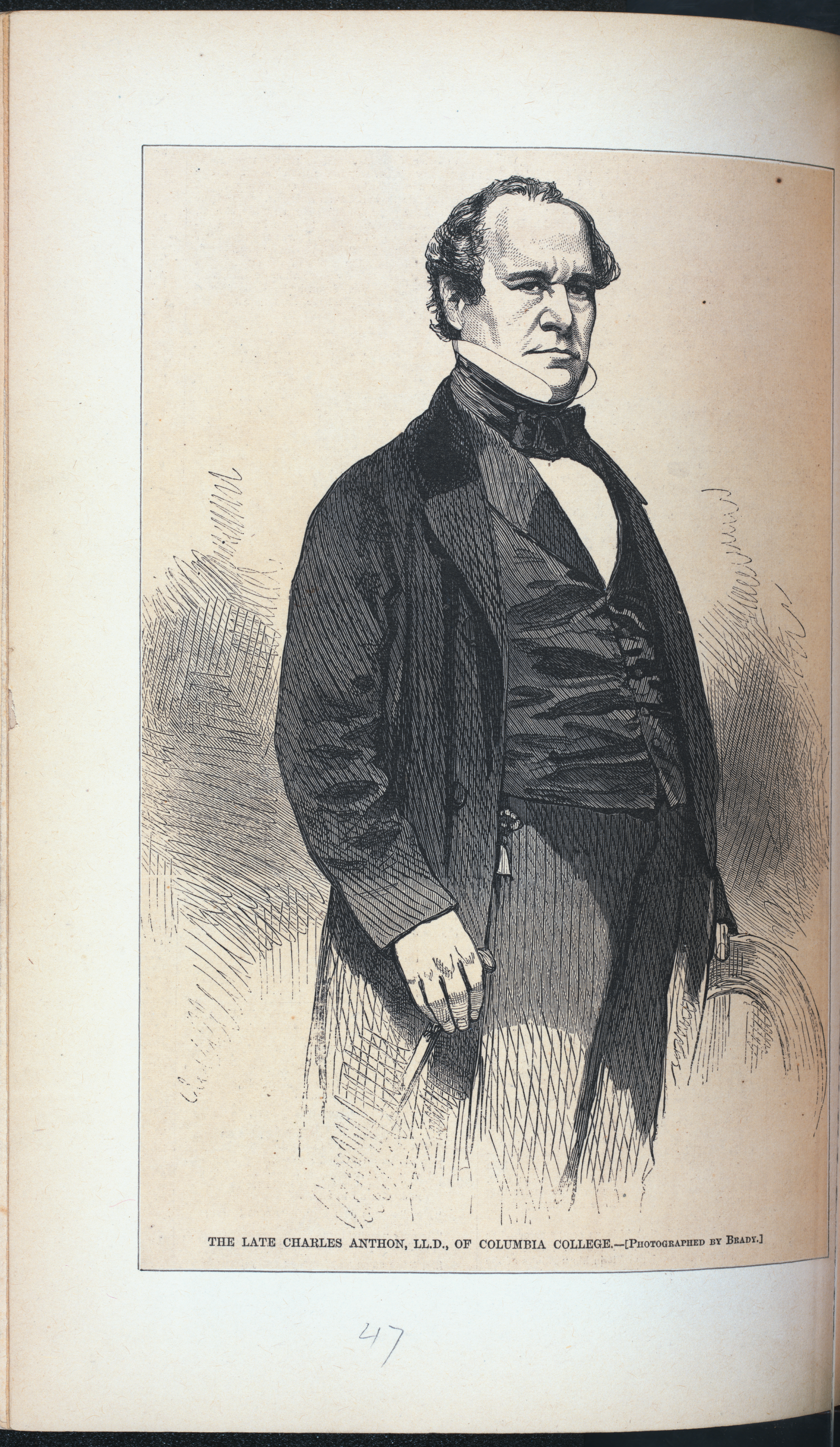
- Columbia professor Charles Anthon
- Born: November 19, 1797; New York City, New York, U.S.
- Died: July 29, 1867 (aged 69)
- Education: Columbia College of Columbia University
- Occupations: Classical scholar, professor, headmaster of the Columbia Grammar & Preparatory School
- Relatives: John Anthon, brother

Charles Anthon (November 19, 1797 – July 29, 1867) was an American classical scholar. Anthon was a professor at Columbia College and became headmaster of its grammar and preparatory school. He produced classical works for schools, which contained assistance and translations in the notes. He had a disagreement with Martin Harris over an account where they discussed the authenticity of the Anthon Transcript of the Book of Mormon. Anthon was also an acquaintance of writer Edgar Allan Poe. He died in New York City at the age of 69.

== Life ==
His father George Christian Anthon was a German-American medical doctor who served in the British Army during the American Revolution until the surrender of Detroit in 1796. George attained the rank of surgeon general, resigned, married the daughter of a French officer, and settled in New York City. Charles was born there on November 19, 1797, graduated with honors from Columbia College in 1815 where he was a member of the Philolexian Society and, after studying law at his elder brother's firm, was called to the bar in 1819. He never practiced. Instead, the next year, he was appointed assistant professor of Greek and Latin at his old college. In 1830, he was made a full professor and become the headmaster of the Columbia Grammar & Preparatory School. In 1835, he was appointed Jay Professor of the Greek Language and Literature in Columbia College upon the resignation of Nathaniel Fish Moore. He retired from the grammar school in 1864 and died in New York on July 29, 1867, at the age of 69.

== Works ==
He produced a large number of classical works for use in colleges and schools, which enjoyed great popularity, although schoolmasters sometimes disliked their use by students, owing to the large amount of assistance and translations contained in the notes. Anthon's books on classical literature commonly included a "classical dictionary". He also wrote A Manual of Greek Literature from the Earliest Authentic Periods to the Close of Byzantine Era, providing a list of all Greek writers in that period, with a summary of their life and works and a bibliography of editions then in use. The overview is still useful today, but outdated. His intention to provide a similar volume for Latin literature was never fulfilled.

Dr. Anthon's work was carried on by his successor, Henry Drisler.

== Anthon Transcript ==
Charles Anthon is famous in connection with the history of the Latter Day Saint movement because of his interactions with Martin Harris in February 1828 concerning a fragment of Joseph Smith's translation of the Book of Mormon. The fragment later came to be known as the Anthon Transcript. According to Harris, Anthon wrote Harris a letter of authenticity declaring the fragment to contain true Egyptian characters. Anthon also confirmed the translation of these characters as correct. When informed that an angel of God had revealed the characters to Joseph Smith, Anthon tore up the authentication, stating that there was no such thing as angels, and asked Harris to bring the plates to him for translation. Martin Harris went to Dr. Samuel L. Mitchill afterwards and received a letter of authenticity from him. Anthon, however, disagreed with Harris' version of their encounter and stated in a letter to Eber D. Howe on February 17, 1834, that the story of Anthon's authentication was false, that Anthon had identified the writings as a hoax, and that Anthon had told Harris that the writings were part of "a scheme to cheat the farmer [Martin Harris] of his money..." Anthon gave a second account in 1841 as to whether he gave Harris a written opinion about the document: "[Harris] requested me to give him my opinion in writing about the paper which he had shown to me. I did so without hesitation, partly for the man's sake, and partly to let the individual 'behind the curtain' see that his trick was discovered. The import of what I wrote was, as far as I can now recollect, simply this, that the marks in the paper appeared to be merely an imitation of various alphabetical characters, and had, in my opinion, no meaning at all connected with them.". Despite the claims of Charles Anthon regarding his interaction with Martin Harris, Martin Harris mortgaged his farm August 25, 1829, to fund the printing of the Book of Mormon.

== Acquaintance with Poe ==
Dr. Anthon was a friend and correspondent of Edgar Allan Poe, who attempted to use their acquaintance to gain a national reputation in literature and journalism as well as publication in 1845 of his collected stories through Harper and Brothers. This was, at the time, unsuccessful due to a doubtful accusation of plagiarism against Poe; however, Poe went on to establish himself in the first rank of American letters.

== Publications ==
=== Reference and instructional works ===
- Charles Anthon, Elements of Latin Prosody and Metre, New York: Swords (1824). online
- A classical dictionary: containing a copious account of all the proper names mentioned in ancient authors etc., by J. Lemprière, D.D., 5th American edition, corrected and improved by Charles Anthon (1825). online
- Richard Valpy, The Elements of Greek Grammar, with additions by C. Anthon, 8th edition (1833). online
- Charles Anthon, A Grammar of the Greek Language (1838). online; revised and corrected by the Rev. J.R. Major, D.D., London: Thomas Tegg (1840). online
- Charles Anthon, A System of Greek Prosody and Metre: for the use of schools and colleges (1839). online; (1842) online
- Charles Anthon, A System of Latin Prosody and Metre, from the Best Authorities, Ancient and Modern, Harper and Brothers (1842).online
- Charles Anthon, First Greek lessons: containing all the inflexions of the Greek language, together with appropriate exercises in the translating and writing of Greek, for the use of beginners. Anthon's Greek Lessons, Part I (1842). online
- Charles Anthon, An Introduction to Greek Prose Composition. Anthon's Greek Lessons, Part II (1842). online
- Charles Anthon, First Latin Lessons, containing the most important parts of the grammar of the Latin language, together with appropriate exercises in the translating and writing of Latin, for the use of beginners. Anthon's Latin Grammar, Part I (1838). online, (1846 printing)
- Charles Anthon, An Introduction to Latin Prose Composition. Anthon's Latin Grammar, Part II (1842). online
- Charles Anthon, A Classical Dictionary, containing an account of the principal proper names mentioned in ancient authors, Harper and Brothers (1842). online
- A new abridgement of Ainsworth's dictionary: English and Latin, for the use of grammar schools, by John Dymock, LL.D., new American edition with corrections and improvements by Charles Anthon, Philadelphia: Butler & Williams (1844). online
- Charles Anthon, A System of Latin Versification, in a series of progressive exercises (1845). online
- A school dictionary of Greek and Roman antiquities, abridged from the larger dictionary by William Smith, LL.D., with corrections and improvements by Charles Anthon, LL.D. (1846). online
- Charles Anthon, A system of ancient and mediæval geography for the use of schools and colleges (1850). online
- Charles Anthon, A Manual of Roman Antiquities, with numerous illustrations (1851). online
- Charles Anthon, A Manual of Grecian Antiquities, with numerous illustrations (1852). online
- Charles Anthon, A Manual of Greek Literature from the Earliest Authentic Periods to the Close of Byzantine Era (1853). online
- A copious and critical English-Latin lexicon, founded on the German-Latin dictionary of Dr. Charles Ernest Georges by Joseph Esmond Riddle and Thomas Kerchever Arnold, first American edition, carefully revised, and containing a copious dictionary of proper names from the best sources, by Charles Anthon, LL.D., New York: Harper and Brothers (1856). online
- A Latin-English and English-Latin dictionary: for the use of schools, chiefly from the lexicons of Freund, Georges, and Kaltschmidt, by Charles Anthon (1859). online
- A School Grammar of the Latin Language by C.G. Zumpt, translated and adapted by Leonhard Schmitz, corrected and enlarged by Charles Anthon (1859). online
- A new classical dictionary of Greek and Roman biography, mythology and geography, partly based upon the Dictionary of Greek and Roman Biography and Mythology by William Smith, LL.D., revised, with numerous corrections and additions, by Charles Anthon, LL.D. (1862). online

=== School editions with commentary ===
- C. Crispi Sallusti opera, omissis fragmentis, omnia: ad optimorum exemplarium fidem recensita, animadversionibus illustravit P. Wilson, LL.D., 4th ed. recensuit notasque suas adspersit Charles Anthon, New York: Carvill (1825). online; Charles Anthon, C. Crispi Sallustii de Catilinae conjuratione belloque Jugurthino Historiae, New York: Carvill (1829) online; 4th ed., Boston (1833) online; Sallust's Jugurthine War and Conspiracy of Catiline, with an English Commentary, and Geographical and Historical Indexes, 6th ed., New York: Harper and Brothers (1837) online; 6th ed. (1838) online; 10th ed. (1854) online
- Charles Anthon, Caesar's Commentaries on the Gallic War; and The First Book of the Greek Paraphrase; with English Notes, Critical and Explanatory, Plans of Battles, Sieges, Etc., and Historical, Geographical, and Archaeological Indexes, Harper and Brothers (1838). online (1862 printing)
- Charles Anthon, Q. Horatii Flacci Poëmata, New York: Carvill (1830). online; The Works of Horace, with English Notes, Critical and Explanatory, Harper and Brothers (1839); new edition (1849) online (1857 printing)
- The Greek Reader, by Frederic Jacobs, new edition, with English notes, critical and explanatory, a metrical index to Homer and Anacreon, and a copious lexicon. By Charles Anthon. (1840). online
- Charles Anthon, The Aeneid of Virgil, with English Notes, Critical and Explanatory, a Metrical Clavis, an Historical, Geographical, and Mythological Index, Harper and Brothers (1843). online
- Charles Anthon, M. Tullii Ciceronis Orationes Selectae, ex recensione Jo. Aug. Ernesti., with an English commentary, London: Priestley (1837) online; new edition, London (1846) online; Select Orations of Cicero, with English Notes, Critical and Explanatory, new edition, New York: Harper and Brothers (1845). online; new edition (1849) online
- Charles Anthon, The De senectute, De amicitia, Paradoxa, and Somnium Scipionis of Cicero, and the Life of Atticus by Cornelius Nepos, with English Notes, Critical and Explanatory (1848). online
- Charles Anthon, The First Six Books of Homer's Iliad with English Notes, Critical and Explanatory, A Metrical Index, and Homeric Glossary, Harper and Brothers (1851). online; The first three books of Homer's Iliad, according to the ordinary text, and also with the restoration of the digamma, new edition by Benjamin Davies, London (1854) online
- Charles Anthon, The Anabasis of Xenophon, with English Notes, Critical and Explanatory, Harper and Brothers (1852). online
- Charles Anthon, Cornelius Nepos with Notes, Historical and Explanatory, Harper and Brothers (1852). online (1871 printing)
- Charles Anthon, The Germania and Agricola, and also Selections from the Annals, of Tacitus, with English Notes, Critical and Explanatory, (1847). online (1852 printing); (1853) online
- Charles Anthon, The Satires of Juvenal and Persius with English Notes Critical and Explanatory, from the Best Commentators, Harper and Brothers, (1857). online
- Hubert Ashton Holden, M.T. Ciceronis De Officiis libri tres, with marginal analysis and an English commentary, first American edition corrected and enlarged by Charles Anthon, (1859). online
- Charles Anthon, An English commentary on the Rhesus, Medea, Hippolytus, Alcestis, Heraclidae, Supplices, and Troades of Euripides (1877). online

== Family ==
His brother John Anthon was a noted jurist. His brother Henry Anthon (1795-1861) was a noted clergyman. His son Charles Edward Anthon was a professor of history and belles-lettres at the New York Free Academy (which later became the College of the City of New York), and a prominent numismatist.

== See also ==
- Reformed Egyptian
