= John Tahourdin White =

English classical scholar (1809–1893)

John Tahourdin White (1809–1893) was an English classical scholar.

== Life ==
He was the second son of John White of Selborne in Hampshire. He matriculated at Corpus Christi College, Oxford, on 28 January 1830, was elected an exhibitioner in the same year, and graduated B.A. in 1834, M.A. in 1839, and B.D. and D.D. in 1866. He was ordained deacon in 1834 as curate at Swynnerton in Staffordshire.

White was appointed reader at St. Stephen Walbrook in 1836, and acted as assistant master at Christ's Hospital from 1836 to 1869. In 1837 he became curate at St. Ann, Blackfriars, was ordained priest in 1839, and in 1841 was appointed curate at St. Martin Ludgate, serving until 1868, when he was instituted rector.

White died at 17 Cambridge Road, Brighton, on 17 December 1893.

== Works ==
White published editions of Greek and Latin authors, including the Grammar School Texts. With Joseph Esmond Riddle he brought out in 1862 A Latin-English Dictionary, London, based on Ethan Allen Andrews's translation of Wilhelm Freund's Wörterbuch der lateinischen Sprache. Freund's Wörterbuch was published at Leipzig between 1834 and 1845, and Andrews's translation at New York in 1852. White and Riddle's Dictionary was later largely superseded by that of Charlton T. Lewis and Charles Short (1879). A College Latin-English Dictionary of intermediate size appeared in 1865, and a Junior Student's Complete Latin-English and English-Latin Dictionary in 1869.

White also edited Robert Lynam's History of the Roman Emperors (London, 1850, 2 vols.).

== Theological publications ==
- St. Matthew's Gospel: with a vocabulary, London, 1887.
- St. Mark's Gospel: with a vocabulary, London, 1887.
- St. Luke's Gospel: with a vocabulary, London, 1888.
- St. John's Gospel: with a vocabulary, London, 1885.
- The Acts of the Apostles: with a vocabulary, London, 1885.
- St. Paul's Epistle to the Romans: with a vocabulary, London, 1886.

== Notes ==
Attribution

This article incorporates text from a publication now in the public domain: Lee, Sidney, ed. (1900). "White, John Tahourdin". Dictionary of National Biography. Vol. 61. London: Smith, Elder & Co.
