= Rhett S. James =

American dramatist

Rhett S. James is a Latter-day Saint author and educator. He is also a playwright.

James was a teacher at the Logan Institute of Religion for 27 years. He wrote the script and lyrics for Martin Harris: The Man who Knew, a musical that was held annually at Martin Harris's gravesite.

In response to writings by D. Michael Quinn, James has also co-written with George L. Milton apologetic defenses of Joseph Smith and Evan Stephens.

Between about 1969 and 1970, James supervised the training of the first seminary and institute teachers in New Zealand. He was involved in starting the LDS Seminary and Institute program in New Zealand.

James has more recently been a professor at LDS Business College.

James has also edited historical documents related to Native Americans in the early period of Mormon settlement in Utah.
