= Joseph Riddle =

Joseph Riddle may refer to:

- Joseph Esmond Riddle (1804–1859), English cleric, scholar and lexicographer
- Joseph Riddle Jr. (1918–1943), United States Navy officer
