= Evan Stephens =

Composer of Religious Music

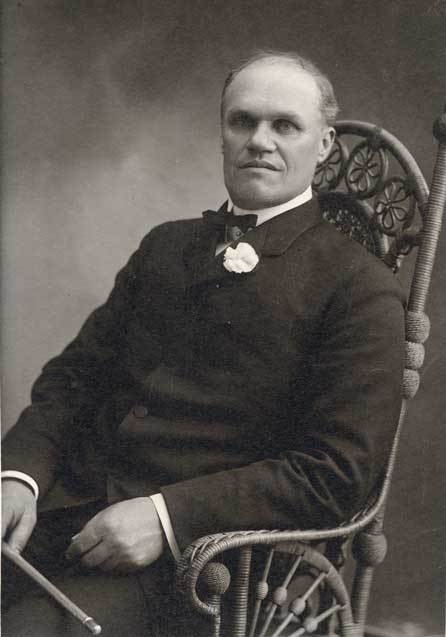
- Stephens in 1904

Personal details
- Born: 28 June 1854; Pencader, Carmarthenshire, Wales, United Kingdom
- Died: 27 October 1930 (aged 76); Salt Lake City, Utah, United States
- Signature

Evan Stephens (28 June 1854 – 27 October 1930) was a Latter-day Saint (historically known as Mormon) composer and hymn writer. He was also the director of the Mormon Tabernacle Choir for 26 years (1890–1916).

== Early life and family ==
Stephens was born at Pencader, Wales. He moved with his family to Willard, Utah Territory when he was twelve. His parents had converted to the Church of Jesus Christ of Latter-day Saints (LDS Church) before his birth. When he was a very small child his mother would take him with her to work in the fields as she raised money to help pay to build the Salt Lake Temple.

Stephens performed in his local congregation's choir as a boy. When Brigham Young came to visit, Stephens was embarrassed by his poverty, particularly his lack of coat or shoes, and painted his feet black with shoe polish. At the bowery before Young entered the building, Stephens became overcome with embarrassment and started to exit the building but ran into Young entering the building. Young encouraged him to sing and he returned to the bowery and sang.

Stephens never married. He had an attachment to a girl in Willard when he was in his early twenties, but she died in a freak accident while in a stage performance. Later, Stephens was engaged to a woman who made a deathbed request at the end of her brief illness that he love her through his music.

After his death, Stephens was sealed by proxy to his great niece, Sarah Daniels. Stephens had intended on marrying her, and arranged for her to come to Utah from the United Kingdom in 1902. Stephens had anticipated that she would convert to the LDS Church on coming to Utah, but when this did not happen, he arranged for her to be his housekeeper. According to interviews of Stephens's relatives conducted in the 1950s and the 1990s, Stephens stated that Daniels would have made a good wife, but he would only marry a member of the LDS Church. After Stephens died, Daniels did join the LDS Church and she was sealed to him by proxy on 5 November 1931 in the Salt Lake Temple, with the ordinance having been approved by LDS Church president Heber J. Grant.

Stephens studied at the University of Deseret.

== Teaching music ==
From 1885 to 1900, Stephens directed the teaching of music at the University of Utah. Stephens also served as the first public school music supervisor in Utah.

== Musical writings ==
In 1899, the Missionary Song Book, edited by Stephens, was distributed in the LDS Church's Southern States Mission.

In the 1927 English-language LDS Church hymnal there were 84 hymns written by Stephens.

Stephens's 18 works in the 1985 English-language edition of the LDS Church hymnal are:

- No. 11 "What Was Witnessed in the Heavens" (music),
- No. 17 "Awake, Ye Saints of God, Awake!" (music),
- No. 18 "The Voice of God Again is Heard" (words and music),
- Nos. 23 (standard) & 312 (women) "We Ever Pray for Thee" (text and adaptation of music by H. A. Tuckett),
- No. 33 "Our Mountain Home So Dear" (music),
- No. 35 "For the Strength of the Hills" (music),
- No. 55 "Lo, the Mighty God Appearing!" (music),
- No. 61 "Raise Your Voices to the Lord" (words and music),
- No. 74 "Praise Ye the Lord" (music),
- No. 91 "Father thy Children to Thee Now Raise" (words and music),
- No. 118 "Ye Simple Souls who Stray" (music),
- No. 120 "Lean on My Ample Arm" (music),
- No. 183 "In Remembrance of Thy Suffering" (words and music),
- No. 229 "Today, While the Sun Shines" (music),
- No. 243 "Let Us All Press On" (words and music),
- No. 254 "True to the Faith" (words and music),
- No. 330 "See The Mighty Angel Flying" (music), and
- No. 337 "O Home Beloved" (words).

Included among Stephens's works is "Utah, We Love Thee" (also sometimes referred to as "Land of the Mountains High"), which became the official state song of Utah in 1937. In 2003, it was designated the official state hymn, and a new state song was named.

== Directing the Mormon Tabernacle Choir ==
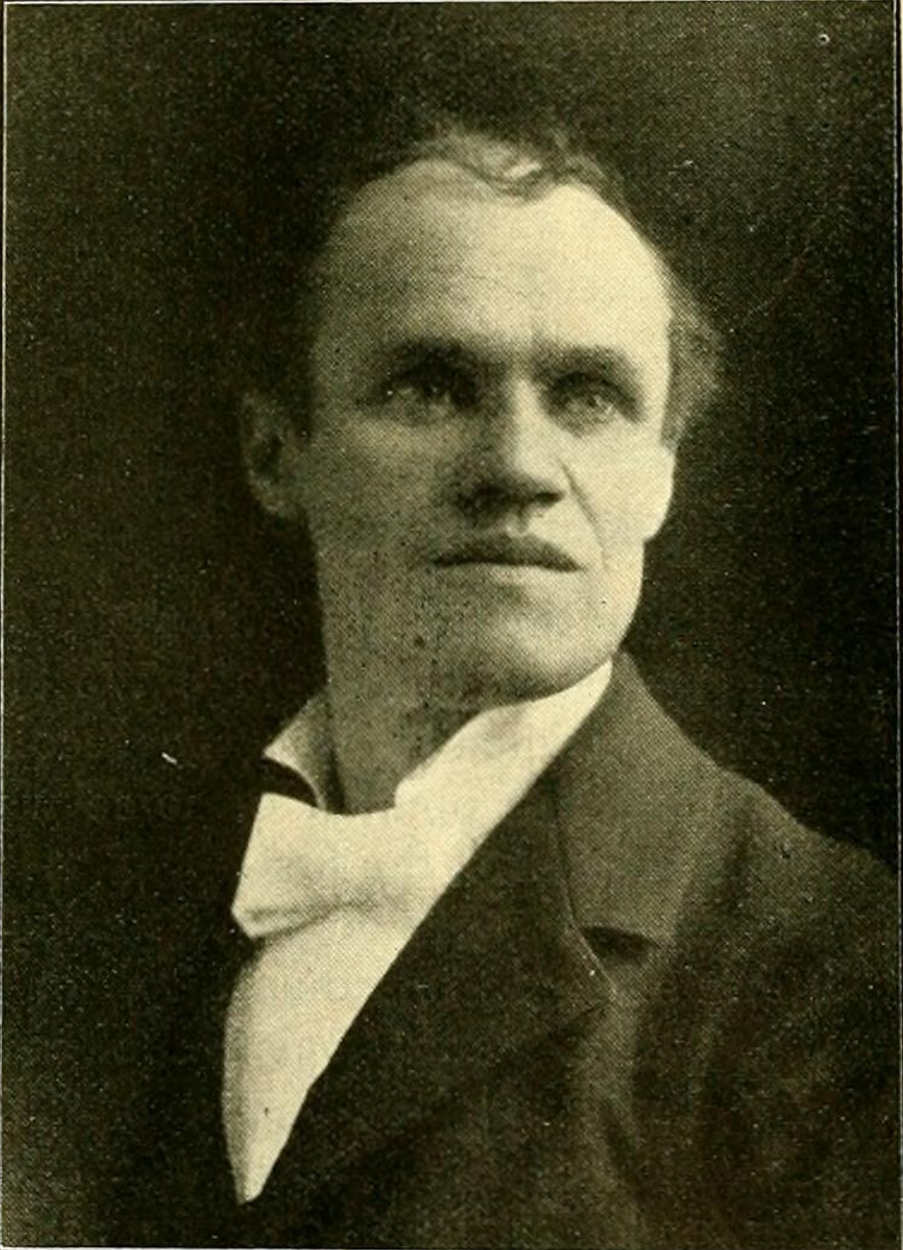
Evan Stephens

Under Evan Stephens's direction the size of the Mormon Tabernacle Choir increased from 125 members to over 300.

Stephens was also the director of the choir who moved it into the field of performing concerts at non-religious events.

For part of the time that Stephens was director of the choir, he held the title of president of the choir and was assisted by two counselors, echoing a system of ecclesiastical leadership used throughout the LDS Church.

Beginning in 1895, Stephens became the first man employed by the LDS Church as full-time choir director. Prior to this, the director of the choir had been viewed as a part-time office, who although given a stipend for his service, was expected to earn his main employ by other methods. In 1895, the leaders of the church decided to make the position of choir director full-time and doubled Stephens salary.

== Alleged homosexuality ==
In his book, Same-Sex Dynamics Among Nineteenth Century Americans, published in 1996, historian D. Michael Quinn expresses his view that Stephens had homosexual relationships and that these were tolerated by the LDS Church hierarchy. Elsewhere, Quinn has theorised that the unmarried Stephens had intimate relationships and shared the same bed with a series of male domestic partners and travelling companions. Quinn claims that some of these relationships were described under a pseudonym in The Children's Friend, a church magazine for children. However, Quinn has admitted that it is possible Stephens never engaged in homosexual conduct.

Several other Mormon writers, including George L. Mitton and Rhett S. James, have called Quinn's research on Stephens into question. They argue that Quinn has engaged in an opportunistic distortion of LDS Church history; they deny any acceptance from previous leaders of homosexual behaviour; and state the teachings of the current leadership of the church "is entirely consistent with the teachings of past leaders and with the scriptures." Specifically, Mitton and James disagree with Quinn's theory that Stephens was involved in intimate relationships with other men, or that the article in The Children's Friend was about these relationships. They point to it instead as reflecting normal youthful respect for older males. They also point out that Stephens's relationship with his great niece, Sarah Daniels, undermines Quinn's claims. Specifically, Stephens maintained a large number of students as residents in his household to prevent the image of impropriety with Daniels, since if he had lived alone with her without other witnesses around, it would have opened him up to accusations of a scandalous relationship. They state that Stephens "is known only as a strictly moral Christian gentleman." Mitton and James also point out that the death of Stephens's fiancee led him to remember her through his music, and that this was a very real and deep-seated emotional connection for him. Ray Bergman—who was in one of Stephens's youth choirs—also disputes any claims that Stephens was homosexual.

== See also ==
- Homosexuality and The Church of Jesus Christ of Latter-day Saints
- God Loveth His Children
