= Clarkston Pageant =

Musical pageant produced by the Church of Jesus Christ of Latter Day Saints

- Written by: Rhett S. James
- Lyrics by: Norma and Frank Dupree
- Subject: The life of Martin Harris
- Genre: Historical musical and religion
- Setting: Palmyra, New York

Premiere
- Date: August 27, 1983
- Directed by: Duane J. Huff

The Clarkston Pageant was a biannually produced musical pageant of the Church of Jesus Christ of Latter Day Saints (LDS) in Cache County, Utah, about the life of Martin Harris.

== Background ==
Martin Harris was an early member of the Church of Jesus Christ of Latter Day Saints in Palmyra, New York. He was a scribe to Joseph Smith, and one of three witnesses to the Book of Mormon. In 1870, at the age of 87, he traveled by train to Utah. He spent the last 5 years of his life there, often sharing his testimony of the Book of Mormon. On July 10, 1875, he died while living in his home in Clarkston, and was then buried in the Clarkston Cemetery.

The grave site became a common place for Latter Day Saints to travel too, with the town of Clarkston holding an annual Martin Harris day. In 1934, the LDS Church held a week long aaronic priesthood pilgrimage, where ten thousand young men would travel to the area to listen to people who knew Martin Harris speak of his testimony. At that time, it was the largest gathering of the aaronic priesthood in the world. The town was interested in continuing this with a new amphitheater on the hillside of the cemetery, but due to the great depression, plans stopped in the excavation phase. In 1948, President of the Church George Albert Smith spoke in front of two thousand five hundred young men on the 119th anniversary of the restoration of the aaronic priesthood.

In 1980, the area was listed on the National Register of Historic Places. That same year, Denzel Clark, the mayor of Clarkson, and apostle L. Tom Perry started renewed interest in building the amphitheater for civic activities. With a variety of donations, the Martin Harris memorial amphitheater was finished in three years on August 6, 1983, seating three thousand people. The Governor of Utah (Scott M. Matheson), the Governor of Idaho (John Evans), and the then President of the Quorum of the Twelve Apostles (Ezra Taft Benson) all spoke at its dedication.

== Musical Production ==
Before the amphitheater was finished, local teacher Rhett S. James was asked to write a script for a pageant revolving around Martin Harris. James decided to create a musical, and began months of research with the LDS Church histories office and descendants of Harris. According to him, his "vision was to see to it that the misconceptions about Martin Harris were corrected" because "when people in the Church hear the name Martin Harris, they often think of the lost 116 manuscript pages". James went through several revisions of his musical, and just three weeks after the amphitheater was completed, the first production of Martin Harris: The Man Who Knew premiered in the amphitheater by the cemetery. Three hundred descendants of Harris had gathered together to view the premier. Though the producers felt like the musical was flawed, the descendants were very supportive of its telling of their ancestor. The first public showing was three days later. Approximately 27 thousand people watched the over 50 cast members in the first week that it was put on.

It was the only LDS pageant to be a musical, as well as the only one where actors actually say their lines, rather than lip sync them on a pre-recorded track. Before each performance, Rhett S. James gave a lecture and answered questions on Martin Harris in front of the crowd. Though tickets were required, it was free to attend. These early performances were funded by donations from the LDS church and community members, as well as profit from the published script in book form.

=== LDS ownership and end ===
In 1990, once attendance began to reach new heights, the LDS Church made the pageant an official production with them running it. In the coming years, this change in management brought numerous changes to the musical, such as shortening the pageant from three hours to one hour, removing the pageant's narrator, addition of night performances, and only having the pageant on every other year. In 1996, 125 cast members and a production crew of five hundred (all LDS church members) performed it in front of thirty five thousand people. In 2015, there were 80 to 85 cast members and a thousand volunteers for a crowd of thirty six thousand people. The church used the pageant as a missionary tool, setting aside 8,300 tickets each year to be specifically given out to non LDS viewers, and reporting that after the 1997 performance, 2,000 attendees requested to visit LDS missionaries.

2017 was the last time that it was held, as the LDS church canceled four out of seven of their pageants the following year, including the Clarkston Pageant, stating they want church members to "focus on gospel learning in their homes and to participate in Sabbath worship and the Church’s supporting programs for children, youth, individuals and families", and that "Local celebrations of culture and history may be appropriate. Larger productions, such as pageants, are discouraged". By the end of its run, it is estimated over one million people viewed the pageant in its history.

== See also ==
- List of pageants of the Church of Jesus Christ of Latter-day Saints
