= A Latin Dictionary =

Latin-language lexicographical work

A Latin Dictionary Founded on Andrews' Edition of Freund's Latin Dictionary
- Cover of a 2020 reprint
- Author: Charlton T. Lewis; Charles Short
- Original title: Harpers' Latin Dictionary: A New Latin Dictionary Founded on the Translation of Freund's Latin-German Lexicon Edited by E. A. Andrews
- Language: English
- Published: 1879
- Publication place: United Kingdom
- Media type: Print
- Pages: xiv + 2019
- Text: A Latin Dictionary Founded on Andrews' Edition of Freund's Latin Dictionary at Wikisource

A Latin Dictionary (or Harpers' Latin Dictionary, often referred to as Lewis and Short or L&S) is a popular English-language lexicographical work of the Latin language, published by Harper and Brothers of New York in 1879 and printed simultaneously in the United Kingdom by Oxford University Press.

== History ==
The work is usually referred to as Lewis and Short after the names of its editors, Charlton T. Lewis and Charles Short. It was derived from the 1850 English translation by Ethan Allen Andrews of an earlier Latin–German dictionary, Wörterbuch der Lateinischen Sprache, by the German philologist Wilhelm Freund, in turn based on I. J. G. Scheller’s Latin–German dictionary of 1783. The Andrews translation was partially revised by Freund himself, then by Henry Drisler, and was finally edited by Short and Lewis.

The division of labour between the two editors was remarkably unequal. Short, a very thorough but slow worker, produced material for the letters A through C, but B and C were lost by Harpers, meaning that his work now appears only in the letter A (216 pages), while Lewis, who worked in the time he could spare from his law practice, was solely responsible for the entries beginning with the letters B through Z (1803 pages). In 1890 Lewis published a heavily abridged version of the dictionary, entitled An Elementary Latin Dictionary, for the use of students. Sometimes called the Elementary Lewis, it is still in print today.

The adoption of the book by Oxford University Press was the result of the failure of its own project to create a new Latin–English dictionary in 1875. Henry Nettleship and John Mayor had been commissioned to produce a new Latin dictionary based on a fresh reading of the sources, but after Mayor withdrew from the project, Nettleship was unable to complete it on his own; he eventually published his research as notes on Lewis and Short. While the Press had earlier published John Riddle's 1835 translation of Scheller's Latin–German dictionary, this was a much more expensive book. The Press thus adopted Harpers' Latin Dictionary as a stopgap measure, paying Harper and Brothers 10 per cent royalties. Harper and Brothers sold its rights to the American Book Company in 1899, shortly before its bankruptcy.

From the time of its publication, many scholars have criticized the dictionary for its errors and inconsistencies. Because of various circumstances, however, no replacement was attempted until 1933, with the Oxford Latin Dictionary, which was completed in 1983. However, the Oxford Latin Dictionary stops at 200CE.

The dictionary's full text (year 1879) is available online at numerous websites.

== Comparison with other dictionaries ==
Among classicists "never a very good dictionary", Lewis and Short has been largely superseded by the Oxford Latin Dictionary, called the OLD for short. Lewis and Short incorporated material from existing Latin dictionaries; the OLD, by contrast, started from scratch, following procedures similar to those of the well-regarded Oxford English Dictionary. Thanks to the increased availability of modern editions, the OLD editors had access to a larger variety of classical works. It was decided in the OLD's planning that the OLD would not encompass Latin written later than AD 200, with a few exceptions. Although classicists still consult Lewis and Short, they tend to prefer the OLD. Lewis and Short retains value for its refined sense of the nuances of English diction as it interfaces with Latin diction (in contrast with OLD's preference for plainer diction) and also for the sensitivity of its quotations from classical texts, reflecting this.

Lewis and Short's primary focus is on classical Latin, not medieval Latin. Nevertheless, Lewis and Short is consulted by medievalists, renaissance specialists, and early modernists, as it includes some late and medieval Latin, if somewhat inconsistently, and classical Latin usages are very relevant in medieval Latin. The Dictionary of Medieval Latin from British Sources supplements Lewis and Short for medieval Latin vocabulary. Another dictionary focused on medieval Latin is J. F. Niermeyer's Mediae Latinitatis Lexicon Minus, first published in 1976, with an enhanced second edition in year 2002, about 1500 pages. The medieval Latin dictionary Glossarium ad scriptores mediae et infimae latinitatis by du Cange was originally published in 3 volumes in 1678, it was expanded to 10 volumes during the 18th and 19th centuries, and it is probably still the most frequently used dictionary for medieval Latin vocabulary.

On occasion people confuse Lewis and Short (or L&S) with Liddell and Scott, its Greek counterpart, entitled A Greek–English Lexicon. The 1925 and later editions of Liddell and Scott are commonly referred to by the abbreviation LSJ after the names of its editors Liddell, Scott and the editor of the 1925 revision, Henry Stuart Jones.

== See also ==
- Dictionary of Medieval Latin from British Sources
- William Whitaker's Words
