= Edward Stevenson =

Mormon missionary (1820–1897)

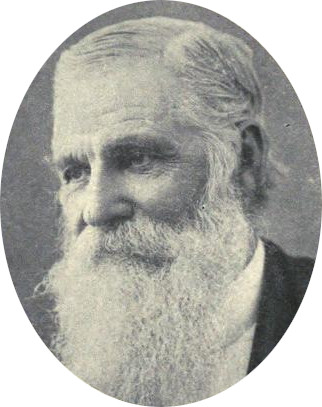

First Council of the Seventy
- October 7, 1894 – January 27, 1897
- Called by: Wilford Woodruff

Personal details
- Born: May 1, 1820; Gibraltar, United Kingdom
- Died: January 27, 1897 (aged 76); Salt Lake City, Utah, United States
- Resting place: Salt Lake City Cemetery; 40.777°N 111.858°W
- Spouse(s): Nancy Areta Porter; Elizabeth Jane DuFresne; Emily Electa Williams; Sarah Jane Porter; Mary Ann DuFresne; Elizabeth Remon; Louisa Yates
- Children: at least 24
- Parents: Joseph Stevenson; Elizabeth Stevens
- Signature

Edward Stevenson (May 1, 1820 – January 27, 1897) was a prominent Latter-day Saint missionary of the 19th century. He also served as a general authority in the Church of Jesus Christ of Latter-day Saints (LDS Church) as one of the seven presidents of the Seventy.

== Early life ==
Stevenson was born in Gibraltar to British parents. His family moved to the United States when he was young. As a young man, he was living in Pontiac, Michigan when he was contacted by a group of Latter-day Saint missionaries, including Joseph Smith, who were on a return leg of a trip to Upper Canada. Stevenson joined the Latter-day Saint church and relocated to its headquarters in Kirtland, Ohio in 1834. He later relocated with the main body of Latter Day Saints to Missouri, then Nauvoo, Illinois, and finally Salt Lake City, Utah Territory in 1847.

== LDS Church service ==
Stevenson also made six missionary journeys, for up to five years at a time. These included three missions to Europe, two missions to the southern United States, and one mission to Mexico. He is recorded as having traveled the most miles under his own expense of any missionary in the history of the LDS Church.

Stevenson settled in Salt Lake City with the first group of Mormon pioneers in 1847, and spent the first five years there getting established, and traveling Utah with Brigham Young and other church authorities to help oversee the establishment of several new settlements, before leaving on one of his missions in 1852.

Stevenson also served as the co-leader of one of the Utah pioneer teams in 1855, and served as the leader of a second one in 1859.

In 1870, he re baptized Martin Harris, one of the three witnesses to the Book of Mormon, after he helped Harris him move to Utah.

Like most prominent Mormon leaders at the time, Stevenson practiced plural marriage, eventually marrying seven simultaneous wives, including two sets of sisters. He had at least 24 children.

He died at his home in Salt Lake City on January 27, 1897.

== Writings ==
Stevenson wrote and self-published a biography of Joseph Smith in 1893, entitled Reminiscences of Joseph, the Prophet. Today it is the earliest surviving documentary source supporting the story of Smith having taught prior to 1836 that he had seen God and Jesus Christ as two separate beings in his First Vision.

A large collection of Stevenson's journals are available and have served as a significant historical resource. They are kept at the Special Collections department of the Harold B. Lee Library at Brigham Young University.

One of the buildings at the LDS Church's Missionary Training Center in Provo, Utah, is named the Edward Stevenson Building, and his portrait hangs in its lobby.
