= Utah, We Love Thee =

"Utah We Love Thee"

Song
- Written: Evan Stephens

"Utah We Love Thee" is the official state hymn of Utah. The song was written by Utah resident Evan Stephens in 1895. It was performed at celebrations held in 1896 when Utah became the 45th state. Evan Stephens was the Mormon Tabernacle Choir conductor from 1890 to 1916. The Utah State legislature made "Utah We Love Thee" the official Utah state song in 1937. In 2003, the Utah legislature voted to replace it with a new state song, "Utah…This Is The Place", and make "Utah, We Love Thee" the official state hymn.

== Lyrics ==
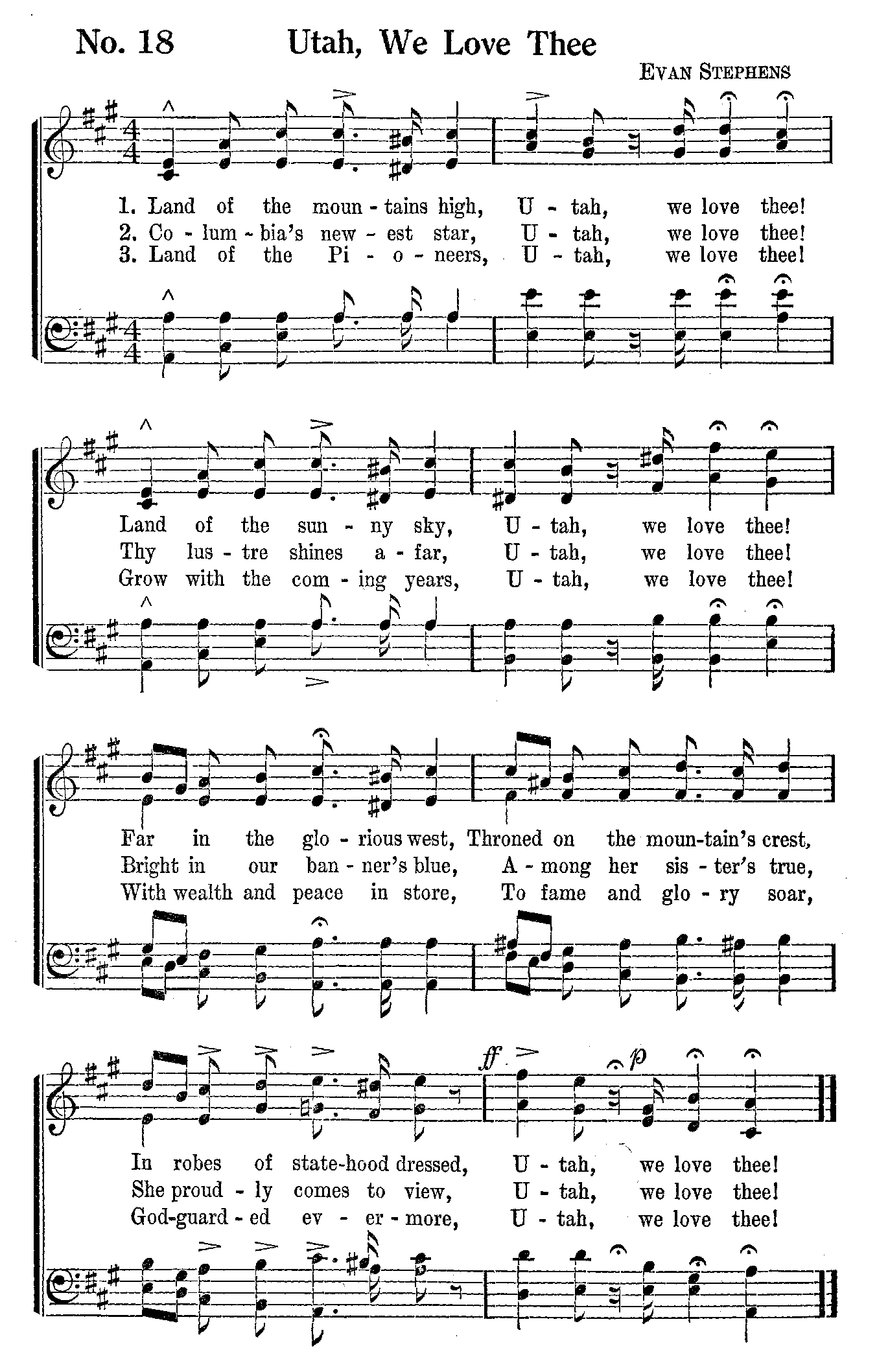
From Deseret Sunday School Songs (1909)

Land of the mountains high, Utah, we love thee!
Land of the sunny sky, Utah, we love thee!
Far in the glorious west, Throned on the mountain's crest,
In robes of statehood dressed, Utah, we love thee!

Columbia's newest star, Utah, we love thee!
Thy lustre shines afar, Utah, we love thee!
Bright in our banner's blue, Among her sisters true,
She proudly comes to view, Utah, we love thee!

Land of the pioneers, Utah, we love thee!
Grow with the coming years, Utah, we love thee!
With wealth and peace in store, To fame and glory soar,
God guarded, evermore, Utah, we love thee!
