= Anthon Transcript =

Mormon document made by Joseph Smith

The "Anthon Transcript" (often misidentified with the "Caractors document") is a piece of paper on which Joseph Smith wrote several lines of characters. According to Smith, the characters were copied from the golden plates (the ancient record from which Smith claimed to have translated the Book of Mormon) and represent the reformed Egyptian writing that was on the plates.

In 1828, the Anthon Transcript was delivered to Charles Anthon, a well-known classical scholar of Columbia College, for an expert opinion on the authenticity of the characters and the translation. Some adherents to the Book of Mormon claim that Anthon attested to the characters' authenticity in writing to Martin Harris but then ripped up his certification after hearing the story of Smith and the plates. Critics of Smith claim that Anthon believed any idea of the plates containing an ancient language was a hoax all along and that Harris was being deceived.

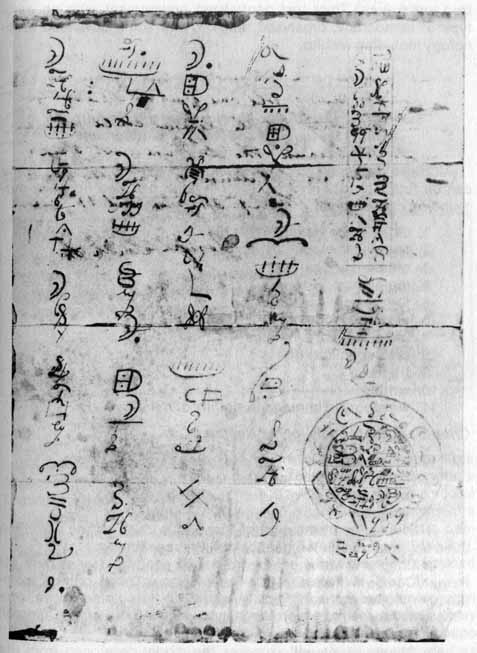
Hofmann forgery of the Anthon Transcript, LDS archives. Note the columnar arrangement and the "Mexican zodiac" described by Anthon

Believers claim that the incident between Harris and Anthon fulfilled a biblical prophecy made by Isaiah, as Anthon is reported to have said to Harris, through Smith's telling of events, "I cannot read a sealed book."

In 1980, Mark Hofmann created and sold a forgery of the Anthon Transcript to leaders of the Church of Jesus Christ of Latter-day Saints (LDS Church), which was revealed to be fraudulent when three Salt Lake City bombings (which Hofmann was convicted for) were investigated.

== Harris's account of meeting with Anthon ==
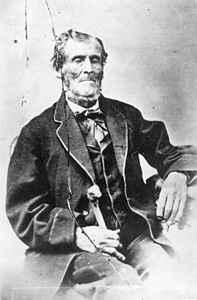
Martin Harris

In 1838, Smith related an account based on Harris's version of the meeting. Smith wrote that Anthon "stated that the translation was correct, more so than any he had before seen translated from the Egyptian. [Harris] then showed him those not yet translated, and said they were Egyptian, Chaldaic, Assyriac, and Arabic"; and that they were "true characters." According to Harris, Anthon wrote Harris a letter of authenticity declaring the fragment to contain true Egyptian characters. Anthon was also reported to have confirmed the translation of these characters as correct. When informed that an angel of God had revealed the characters to Smith, Anthon reportedly tore up the authentication stating that there was no such thing as angels and asked Harris to bring the plates to him for translation. Harris then went to Dr. Samuel L. Mitchill, who sanctioned what Anthon said.

== Anthon's accounts of meeting with Harris ==
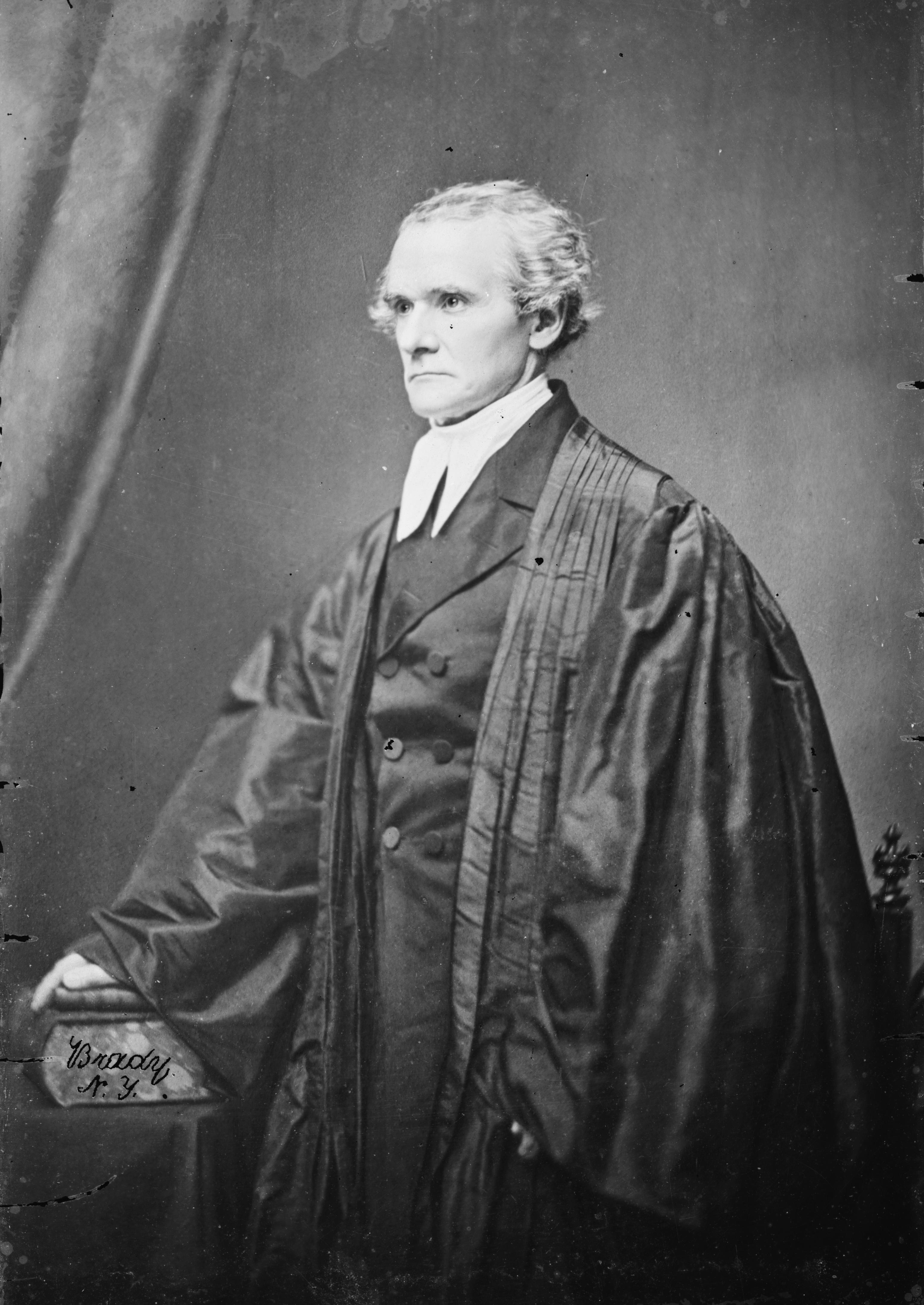
Columbia professor Charles Anthon

In 1834, Anthon stated in a letter that, "The whole story about my having pronounced the Mormonite inscription to be 'reformed Egyptian hieroglyphics' is perfectly false. ... I soon came to the conclusion that it was all a trick, perhaps a hoax. ... [Harris] requested an opinion from me in writing, which of course I declined giving." Anthon described the transcript in that letter as containing "(g)reek and Hebrew letters, crosses and flourishes, Roman letters inverted or placed sideways... arranged in perpendicular columns, and the whole ended in a rude delineation of a circle divided into various compartments, decked with various strange marks." Anthon stated in the letter that the story of his supposed authentication was false, that Anthon had identified the writings as a hoax, and that he had told Harris that the writings were part of "a scheme to cheat the farmer [Harris] of his money".

Anthon gave a second account in 1841 that contradicted his 1834 account as to whether he gave Harris a written opinion about the document: "[Harris] requested me to give him my opinion in writing about the paper which he had shown to me. I did so without hesitation, partly for the man's sake, and partly to let the individual 'behind the curtain' see that his trick was discovered. The import of what I wrote was, as far as I can now recollect, simply this, that the marks in the paper appeared to be merely an imitation of various alphabetical characters, and had, in my opinion, no meaning at all connected with them." In the 1841 account, Anthon described the characters as "arranged in columns like the Chinese mode of writing .. (g)reek, Hebrew, and all sort of letters ... intermingled with sundry delineations of half moons, stars, and other natural objects, and the whole ended in a rude representation of the Mexican zodiac."

Anthon provided a third account in an August 12, 1844 letter and indicated, referring to Harris, "I told the man at once that he was imposed upon and that the writing was mere trash." Anthon described the transcript as containing "in one or two parallel columns rude imitations of Hebrew and Greek characters together with various delineations of sun, moon, stars, &c.."

Anthon in the first two accounts maintained that he told Harris that Harris was the victim of a fraud. Pomeroy Tucker, a contemporary of Harris and Smith, opined in 1867 that all the scholars whom Harris visited "were understood to have scouted the whole pretense as too depraved for serious attention, while commiserating the applicant as the victim of fanaticism or insanity."

== Caractors Document ==
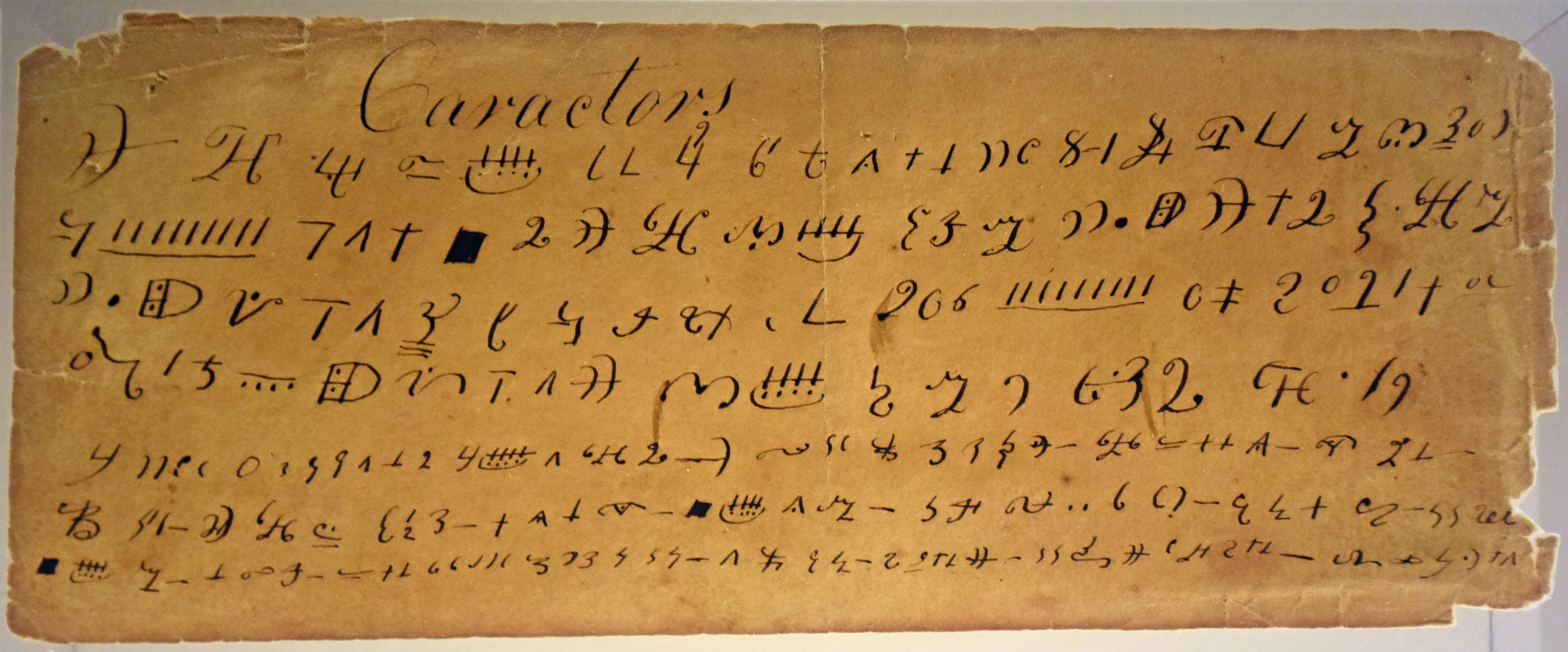
Photograph of the "Caractors" document, previously purported to be the Anthon Transcript

The Reorganized Church of Jesus Christ of Latter Day Saints (now known as Community of Christ) purchased a handwritten slip of paper from the heirs of David Whitmer, then thought to be the Anthon Transcript; this particular candidate is now called the Caractors Document. Whitmer, who once owned the document, stated that it was this slip of paper that Harris showed to Anthon.

Both Mormon apologists and critics, however, indicate that it is not certain that the Caractors Document is the original Anthon Transcript, since Anthon had described that the characters on the slip he saw were arranged in vertical columns and ended in a "rude delineation of a circle divided into various compartments, decked with various strange marks, and evidently copied after the Aztec calendar given by Humboldt," (1834) or "a rude representation of the Mexican zodiac" (1841). In the spring of 1828, Martin Harris' wife Lucy colluded with an accomplice, Flanders Dyke, to steal the Anthon Transcript in order to discredit the Book of Mormon, thus the Caractors Document cannot be the Anthon Transcript.

Recent scholarship, including handwriting analysis, suggests the "Caractors Document" was written in or after 1829, by David Whitmer's brother John Whitmer, and therefore would not have been available to show Anthon or others in 1828. The symbols on the document were published twice in 1844, after Smith's death, as characters that had been copied from the gold plates, one of them in the December 21 issue of The Prophet. In 1956 a request for review of the Caractors Document was made to three recognized egyptologists: Sir Alan Gardiner, William C. Hayes, and John A. Wilson. Gardiner replied that he saw no resemblance with "any form of Egyptian writing." Hayes stated that it might be an inaccurate copy of something in hieratic script and that "some groups look like hieratic numerals", adding that "I imagine, however, that the inscription bears a superficial resemblance to other scripts, both ancient and modern, of which I have no knowledge."

Wilson gave the most detailed reply, saying that "This is not Egyptian writing, as known to the Egyptologist. It obviously is not hieroglyphic, nor the "cursive hieroglyphic" as used in the Book of the Dead. It is not Coptic, which took over Greek characters to write Egyptian. Nor does it belong to one of the cursive stages of ancient Egyptian writing: hieratic, abnormal hieratic, or demotic." Wilson added that "it does not conform to the normal pattern of cursive," and that because it was purported to be altered it may "remove this context from the professional analysis by the Egyptologist."

Four non-linguist Mormon translators with varying levels of education have attempted to decipher the "Caractors" document. The document is portrayed in the 2004 film The Work and the Glory.

The "Caractors Document" was sold in 2024 to the Church of Jesus Christ of Latter-Day Saints as part of a larger transfer of physical property between the two organizations.
