= Lucy Harris =

Critic of Mormonism (1792–1836)

- Born: May 1, 1792; Smithfield, Rhode Island, U.S.
- Died: 1836 (aged 43–44); Palmyra, New York, U.S.
- Spouse: Martin Harris (m. 1808–1836)

Lucy Harris (May 1, 1792 – 1836) is a figure of importance in the early history of the Latter Day Saint movement. She was the wife of Martin Harris, and an early skeptic of Joseph Smith's claim that he translated the Book of Mormon from golden plates.

== Biography ==
=== Early life ===
Lucy Harris was born on May 1, 1792, at Smithfield, Providence County, Rhode Island. She was the daughter of Rufus Harris and Lucy Hill, who were affiliated with but not members of the Religious Society of Friends (Quakers). She married Martin Harris on March 27, 1808, in Palmyra, New York. By 1827, she had become partially deaf.

=== Harris and the Book of Mormon ===
Early on during the translation of the Book of Mormon, Harris became frustrated with her husband and skeptical of Joseph Smith because of how much Martin was helping Smith with the translation effort. She questioned Smith personally about the plates and demanded to see them. He told her, "he was not permitted to exhibit them to anyone except those whom the Lord should appoint to testify of them." This did not resolve her concern and she persisted in demanding to see the plates.

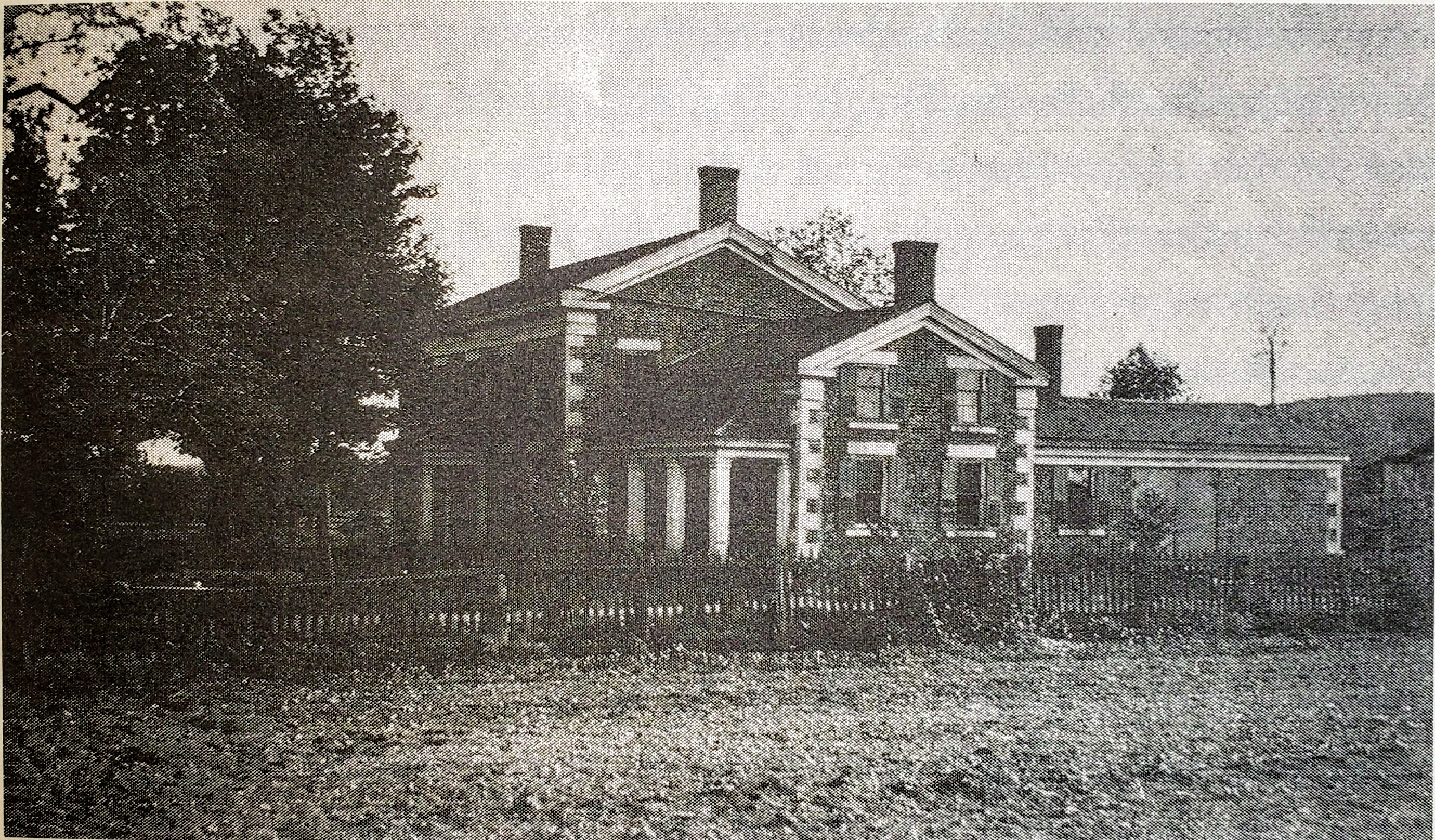
Martin and Lucy Harris home in Palmyra Township, Wayne County, New York

In order to convince Lucy that they were translating an ancient book of scripture, Martin Harris asked Smith to let him borrow the first 116 pages of the book's translation. Smith said that these pages of the Book of Mormon were a translation from the Book of Lehi. At the insistence of Martin Harris (and despite Smith saying he was warned not to by the Lord), Smith reluctantly loaned the pages to him. The manuscript was subsequently lost, and a variety of theories as to its disappearance have arisen. Some Latter Day Saints believe that Lucy hid them from Smith after they had been altered, or that they were given to friends, otherwise disposed of in some way, or that they were stolen from the Harrises' house.

When Martin Harris approached Smith and told him what happened, Smith became angry with himself for not heeding "the Lord's admonition" to not loan the manuscript to Harris and left to go and pray. Subsequently, Smith lost the ability to translate "for a season" while he went through a "repentance process." Ultimately, Smith stated he received a revelation wherein he was instructed not to retranslate the portion of the golden plates the 116 pages were taken from "because wicked men had stolen the pages and altered them, hoping to discredit Smith when he translated them again and the two manuscripts did not match because of their alterations." Instead, the material would be replaced with Nephi's abridgment of his father's record. However, according to Lucy Mack Smith, Lucy Harris did give Joseph 28 dollars to go towards the translation and publication of the plates, claiming that she had received a vision testifying of their truth, as well as being shown the physical plates.

=== Later life ===
In part due to the continued disagreement with her husband over the legitimacy of Smith and the golden plates—and because of the need to sell 151 acres of his farm to pay off the mortgage he incurred to publish the Book of Mormon—in 1830 Harris and her husband separated. Lucy Harris was described by her detractor Lucy Mack Smith as a woman of "irascible temper," but Martin Harris may also have abused Lucy Harris. Lucy Harris also suggested that her husband may have committed adultery with a neighboring "Mrs. Haggart." She died in 1836 at the age of 44.

== Allegations by the Smith family ==
According to the journal of Joseph Smith's mother, Lucy Mack Smith, Harris expressed once that she "missed her husband," but after she informed Harris that he left to accompany Joseph Smith, and to take the Egyptian characters to the East to "call on all the professed linguists... in giving a translation of the characters," Harris "became highly exasperated, and charged me with planning the whole affair." After contending briefly with Harris, Smith reported, "'Now, stop' said I, 'do you know that we have never asked you for money or property? and that if we had been disposed to take advantage of your liberality, could we not have obtained at least, two hundred and seventy dollars of your cash?' She answered in the affirmative, notwithstanding she went home in a great rage, determined to have satisfaction for the treatment which she had received. In a short time Harris returned, and his wife's anger kindled afresh at his presence, insomuch that she prepared a separate bed and room for him, which room she refused to enter."

In a later report by Smith, she described the reaction of Lucy Harris upon her discovery of damage to a chest of drawers, a consequence of Martin's decision to pick the lock (when he was unable to locate the key) to show the manuscript pages to a friend: "When Mrs. Harris returned, and discovered the marred state of her [chest of drawers], her irascible temper was excited to the utmost pitch, and an intolerable storm ensued, which descended with the greatest violence upon the devoted head of her husband."

== In popular culture ==
- Lucy Harris is portrayed in the comedy series South Park in the episode "All About the Mormons?," in which she expresses her skepticism of Joseph Smith's claims by hiding Smith's original manuscript, arguing that he should be able to reproduce it if it was really dictated to him by God. While the musical interlude during the rest of the episode consists of a voice singing "dum-dum-dum-dum-dum," the portions of the interlude involving Lucy Harris are followed by the voice singing "smart-smart-smart-smart-smart."
- Author Christopher Hitchens references Harris's theft of the first hundred and sixteen pages of Smith's manuscript and her challenge to him to reproduce them in his 2007 book God is Not Great: How Religion Poisons Everything saying, "Determined women like this appear far too seldom in the history of religion."
