= Henry Drisler =

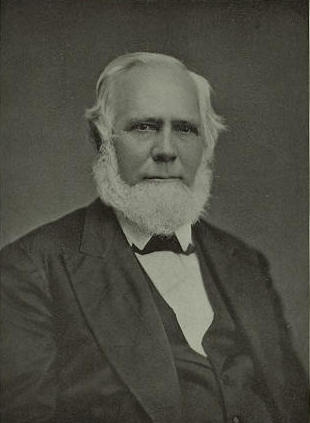
Henry Drisler

Henry Drisler (December 27, 1818 – November 30, 1897) was an American classical scholar.

== Life ==
He was born in Richmond County, New York. Drisler graduated at Columbia College in 1839, taught classics in the Columbia grammar school for four years, and was then appointed tutor in classics in the college. In 1845 he became adjunct professor of Latin and Greek there, in 1857 was appointed to the new separate chair of Latin language and literature, and ten years later succeeded Dr. Charles Anthon as Jay Professor of Greek Language and Literature. He was acting president in 1867 and again in 1888 to 1889. From 1890 to his retirement as professor emeritus in 1894, he was dean of the School of Arts, as the undergraduate division of Columbia was known at the time. (For this reason, some scholars consider him, and not John Howard Van Amringe, to have been the first dean of Columbia College.) He died in New York City in 1897.

Dr. Drisler completed and supplemented Dr. Anthon's labors as an editor of classical texts. His criticisms and corrections of Liddell and Scott's A Greek–English Lexicon, of which he produced American editions beginning in 1846. He revised and augmented the seventh edition (1883) for an American one (1889) which won his name a place on the title-page of the eighth British edition in 1897. In 1870 he published a revised and enlarged edition of Yonge's English-Greek Lexicon. His revisions are also part of the history of the work that is currently available as Lewis and Short's A Latin Dictionary.

Dr. Drisler ardently opposed slavery. In 1863, he wrote a refutation of Episcopal Bishop John Henry Hopkins' book the Bible View of Slavery by John H. Hopkins, D. D., Bishop of the Diocese of Vermont: Examined by Henry Drisler. The refutation relied completely on the Bible and displayed Dr. Drisler's wide range of scholarship.
