= Robert Lynam (writer) =

English cleric, schoolteacher, writer and editor (1796-1845)

Robert Lynam (14 April 1796 – 12 October 1845) was an English cleric, schoolteacher, writer and editor.

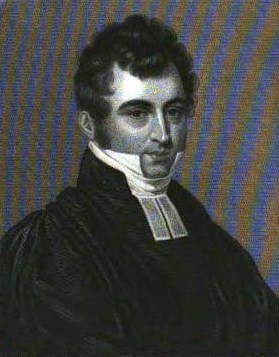
Robert Lynam

== Life ==
The son of Charles Lynam, a spectacle-maker of the parish of St. Alphage, London Wall, he was born in London on 14 April 1796. He was admitted to Christ's Hospital in March 1806, leaving in 1814, and graduated B.A. at Trinity College, Cambridge, in 1818, M.A. in 1821. He was ordained deacon in 1820, priest in 1821.

Lynam was appointed assistant mathematical master at Christ's Hospital in 1818, and was promoted in 1820 to be fourth grammar master—a post which he resigned in 1832 for that of assistant chaplain and secretary to the Magdalene Hospital. He was St. Matthew's day preacher at Christ's Hospital in 1821 and 1835, and was subsequently curate and lecturer of Cripplegate Without until his death in Bridgewater Square, London, on 12 October 1845. He left a widow and nine children.

== Works ==
Besides some sermons Lynam published:

- The History of England during the Reign of George III, London, 1825.
- The History of the Roman Emperors from Augustus to the Death of Marcus Antoninus, 2 vols., London, 1850, with portrait; published after the author's death by John Tahourdin White, a master at Christ's Hospital.

Lynam is mainly remembered as an editor:

- The fifteenth edition of the translation of Charles Rollin's Ancient History, 8 vols. 1823, with a memoir.
- The Complete Works of Philip Skelton, rector of Fintona, 6 vols. 1824, dedicated to John Plumptre.
- The Complete Works of William Paley, with Life and Extracts from his Correspondence, 4 vols., 1825.
- The Works of Samuel Johnson, 6 vols. 1825.
- The Edinburgh Mirror (1779–80), with introductory preface and notices of the main contributors, London, 1826.
- The British Essayist, with Prefaces Biographical, Historical, and Critical, with Portraits, 30 vols. London, 1827; contended with the British Essayists (1803 and 1823) of Alexander Chalmers.

== Notes ==
Attribution

This article incorporates text from a publication now in the public domain: Lee, Sidney, ed. (1893). "Lynam, Robert". Dictionary of National Biography. Vol. 34. London: Smith, Elder & Co.
