= Thomas Kerchever Arnold =

British theologian

Thomas Kerchever Arnold (1800 – 9 March 1853) was an English theologian and voluminous writer of educational works.

== Life ==
Arnold was born in 1800. His father, Thomas Graham Arnold, was a doctor of Stamford. He was educated at Trinity College, Cambridge, was seventh junior optime in the mathematical tripos of 1821, and was elected fellow of his college shortly afterwards. He took his degree of B.A. in the same year, and that of M.A. in 1824. In 1830 he was presented to the living of Lyndon, in Rutland, where his parishioners only numbered one hundred. He at first devoted his ample leisure to theology, and showed himself an obstinate opponent of the views advanced by the leaders of the Oxford Movement. From 1838 until his death he applied himself mainly to the preparation of school books, which procured him a very wide reputation. He died at Lyndon Rectory of bronchitis after a few days' illness on 9 March 1853. A writer in The Guardian at the time of his death describes him as "remarkable for an almost feminine gentleness of manner, and for the unaffected simplicity of his life."

== Works ==
=== Classics textbooks ===
Arnold began his career as an educational writer with the publication of the Essentials of Greek Accidence in 1838, and this work was followed almost immediately by his Practical Introduction to Greek Prose Composition, which had an unprecedented success, and was "the keystone of his literary fortunes." The book reached a fourth edition in 1841, and a seventh in 1849, when its sales had exceeded 20,000 copies. It was at once adopted as a textbook in the higher classes of the chief schools of England. Its leading merit consisted in its author's judicious use of the system and researches of recent German scholars — "in applying the method of Ollendorff to the syntax of Buttmann."

In 1839 Arnold issued a Latin Prose Composition on a similar plan. It met with a welcome scarcely less warm than that accorded to its forerunner and became the basis for the immensely popular revision by George Granville Bradley known as "Bradley's Arnold". In the succeeding years he prepared a whole library of classical school-books, which included translations and adaptations of many German and American works. In association with the Rev. J. E. Riddle he published in 1847 an English-Latin Lexicon, based on a German work by Dr. C. E. Georges, which cost him, he wrote in the preface, "many years of labour." Between 1848 and 1853 he edited, in twenty-five volumes, portions of all the chief Latin and Greek authors, and published handbooks of classical antiquities, the Anticleptic Gradus and similar works.

=== Other school textbooks ===
Nor did he confine himself to the classics. He superintended the publication of English, French, German, Italian, and Hebrew grammars, and aided in the preparation of a Handbook of Hebrew Antiquities and a Boy's Arithmetic. Almost all his educational writings bear the distinct impress of German influence. In his classical work he depended largely on Madvig, Krüger, Zumpt, and other less known scholars; his treatment of modern languages was also based on German models, and Arnold was generally ready to acknowledge his obligations to foreign writers.

=== Theology ===
As a theological writer Arnold was almost equally voluminous. His earliest published work was a sermon on the Faith of Abel, which appeared in the third volume of a collection of Family Sermons in 1833, and four years later he projected and edited a periodical under the title of the Churchman's Quarterly Magazine, which soon perished. Subsequently, he made two similar attempts to further the interests of the Church of England by means of periodical literature. In January 1844 he published the first number of the Churchman's Monthly Companion, which succumbed to popular indifference eight months later, and in 1851 he started another monthly magazine, entitled the Theological Critic, which lived on until his death in 1853. Arnold's contributions to theological literature also included five pamphlets on ecclesiastical questions raised by the Oxford Movement; an abridgment of an American version of Hengstenberg's Christology; two volumes of sermons, one published in 1845, and the other posthumously in 1858; and Short Helps to Daily Devotion (1847). He likewise issued controversial treatises criticising well-known theological works like Taylor's Interpretations of the Fathers, Elliott's Horæ Apocalypticæ, and Dean Close's sermons, in all of which, according to a sympathetic critic in the Guardian of 1853, "his critical eye discerned unsoundness . . . which, if not exposed, was likely to do extensive mischief."

=== Critical reaction ===
In an article in Fraser's Magazine for February 1853, afterwards published in pamphlet form and attributed to John William Donaldson, an attempt was made to discredit Arnold's classical schoolbooks. In a temperate reply, written a few weeks before his death, Arnold rebutted some of the more sinister imputations on his character in the article. The popularity of a few of the books that Donaldson specially denounced survived his attack.
