= Joseph Esmond Riddle =

Joseph Esmond Riddle (1804–1859) was an English cleric, scholar and lexicographer.

== Life ==
The eldest of the eight children of Joseph Riddle of Old Market Street, Bristol, he was born there on 7 April 1804. From Mr. Porter's school in Bristol he was sent by the Bristol society for educating young men for the church to Mr. Havergal at the rectory in Astley, Worcestershire. He matriculated at St Edmund Hall, Oxford, on 18 January 1825, and obtained a first class in classics, graduating B.A. in Michaelmas term 1828, and M.A. in 1831.

From 1828 to 1830 Riddle lived at Ramsgate, where he took pupils. In 1830 he was ordained deacon, and was successively curate of Everley, Upper Slaughter (from 1832), Reading and All Souls', Marylebone. In 1836 he was assistant minister at Brunswick Chapel, Upper Berkeley Street, and in 1837 he became curate of Harrow, soon moving to Shipton Moyne, Gloucestershire.

Subsequently Riddle returned to Oxford in order to make use of the libraries. He was select preacher at Oxford in 1834 and 1854, and Bampton lecturer in 1852. From 1840 until his death, on 27 August 1859, he was incumbent of St. Philip's, Leckhampton in Gloucestershire. He was a vigorous defender of evangelical principles against the Tractarian movement.

== Works ==
At Ramsgate Riddle began a translation of Immanuel Johann Gerhard Scheller's folio Latin dictionary, Lexicon totius Latinitatis, and it was published at the Clarendon Press in 1835. Several abridgments followed, and in 1838 he issued a Complete English-Latin Dictionary, and in 1849 A Copious and Critical Latin-English Lexicon, based on the dictionaries of Wilhelm Freund. Riddle was also joint editor of Latin dictionaries with John Tahourdin White, and of an English-Latin Dictionary with Thomas Kerchever Arnold.

Riddle's other major publications were:

- A Course of Scripture Reading for every Day in the Year, Oxford, 1831.
- Illustrations of Aristotle on Men and Manners from the Dramatic Works of Shakspeare, Oxford, 1832.
- A Scriptural Commentary on the First Epistle of Peter, London, 1834.
- Letters from an absent Godfather, 1837.
- Luther and his Times, London, 1837.
- Sermons Doctrinal and Practical, London, 1838.
- Manual of Christian Antiquities, London, 1839.
- Ecclesiastical Chronology, London, 1840.
- British Commentary on the Gospels, London, 1843.
- The Gospels in Greek, for Schools, 1844. Riddle's compatriot J. T. White, published all four Gospels in Greek with a vocabulary.
- A Progressive Latin-English Vocabulary, London, 1847.
- Churchman's Guide to the Use of the English Liturgy, London, 1848.
- Natural History of Infidelity and Superstition in contrast with Christian Faith (Bampton Lectures), Oxford and London, 1852.
- History of the Papacy to the Period of the Reformation, London, 1854.
- Manual of Scripture History, London, 1857.
- Outlines of Scripture History, being an abridgement ..., London, 1859.
- Household Prayers, London, 1857; reissued 1887.

Riddle contributed to the Encyclopædia Metropolitana the articles Annals of the East, from the Rise of the Ottoman Empire to the Capture of Constantinople; and Ecclesiastical History of the Fifteenth Century.

== Family ==
Riddle married, in 1836, Margaret Sharwood, who survived him, and by whom he had a son, Arthur Esmond Riddle, rector of Tadmarton, and a daughter.

== Notes ==
Attribution

This article incorporates text from a publication now in the public domain: Lee, Sidney, ed. (1896). "Riddle, Joseph Esmond". Dictionary of National Biography. Vol. 48. London: Smith, Elder & Co.
