= Martin Harris (Latter Day Saints) =

Book of Mormon witness (1783–1875)

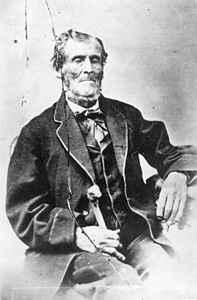

Personal details
- Born: May 18, 1783; Easton, New York, U.S.
- Died: July 10, 1875 (aged 92); Clarkston, Utah Territory, U.S.
- Resting place: Clarkston City Cemetery, Utah; 41°55′52.08″N 112°2′24.74″W
- Spouse(s): Lucy Harris (m. 1808; died 1836) Caroline Young (m. 1836–1875)
- Signature

Martin Harris (May 18, 1783 – July 10, 1875) was an early convert to the Latter Day Saint movement who financially guaranteed the first printing of the Book of Mormon and also served as one of Three Witnesses who testified that they had seen the golden plates from which Joseph Smith said the Book of Mormon had been translated.

== Early life ==
Harris was born in Easton, New York, the second of the eight children born to Nathan Harris and Rhoda Lapham. According to historian Ronald W. Walker, little is known of his youth. When he was 9, his family moved to Palmyra (then known as Swift's Landing), where his father bought 600 acres of land. On March 27, 1808, Harris married his first cousin Lucy Harris. Between 1809 and 1822, they would have four children together.

Harris served with the 39th regiment of the New York State Militia of Ontario County, New York in the War of 1812. He was an orderly sergeant, and when he was called for active duty in 1813, he hired a substitute to serve in his place for a period of three months. It was registered that Harris served 9 days of active duty, during which time he served as a private. Five of those days came when he helped secure Sodus Point following a skirmish in 1813, and four of those came from the battle of Pultneyville, in which he protected the village from British landing in 1814.

Until 1831, Harris lived in Palmyra, New York, where he was a prosperous farmer. Harris was very involved in the community, being elected multiple times to be the overseer of Palmyra highways and to the Wayne county committee on Vigilance. Harris's neighbors considered him "honest," "industrious," "benevolent," and a "worthy citizen." On Harris's departure from New York to gather with Mormons in Ohio, the local paper wrote: "Mr. Harris was among the early settlers of this town, and has ever borne the character of an honorable and upright man, and an obliging and benevolent neighbor. He had secured to himself by honest industry a respectable fortune—and he has left a large circle of acquaintances and friends to pity his delusion."

=== Pre-Mormon religious activity ===
According to a family friend, "In his early life, he [Martin] had been brought up a Quaker, and then took to Methodism as more congenial to his Nature". Despite that, he and his parents were never official members of the Religious Society of Friends, the Quaker organization.

Accounts from acquaintances of Harris assert he was well-versed in the Bible, and "could quote more scripture than any man in the neighborhood". One acquaintance recalled that Harris had mastered entire books from the Bible, and would "defy any man to show me any passage of scripture that I am not posted on or familiar with". However, he had refrained from any formal church affiliation, and his resistance to accept the teachings of traditional churches irritated ministers.

Around the age of 35, Harris had a religious awakening influenced by itinerant preachers during the Second Great Awakening, and reportedly started attending churches occasionally. Acquaintances described him as being "tossed to and fro" by the differing views of the revivalists, "the more extravagant the better." One anti-Mormon source later claimed Harris changed denominations at least five times before becoming a Mormon: "first an orthodox Quaker, then a Universalist, next a Restorationer, then a Baptist, next a Presbyterian, and then a Mormon." However, non-Mormon historian Dan Vogel notes that "there is no evidence that formally connects Harris with the Baptist or Presbyterian churches."

== Early interaction with Smith ==
The Smith family moved to Palmyra in 1816, and in 1824, Harris employed Joseph Smith Sr., to dig a well and a cistern. During this period, Harris had identified himself as an "un-churched Christian". Smith Sr. reportedly told Harris about the gold plates in 1824. Harris later recounted the first time he saw Joseph Smith use a seer stone, when the latter used it to locate a lost object for Harris.

=== Role in Anthon transcript ===
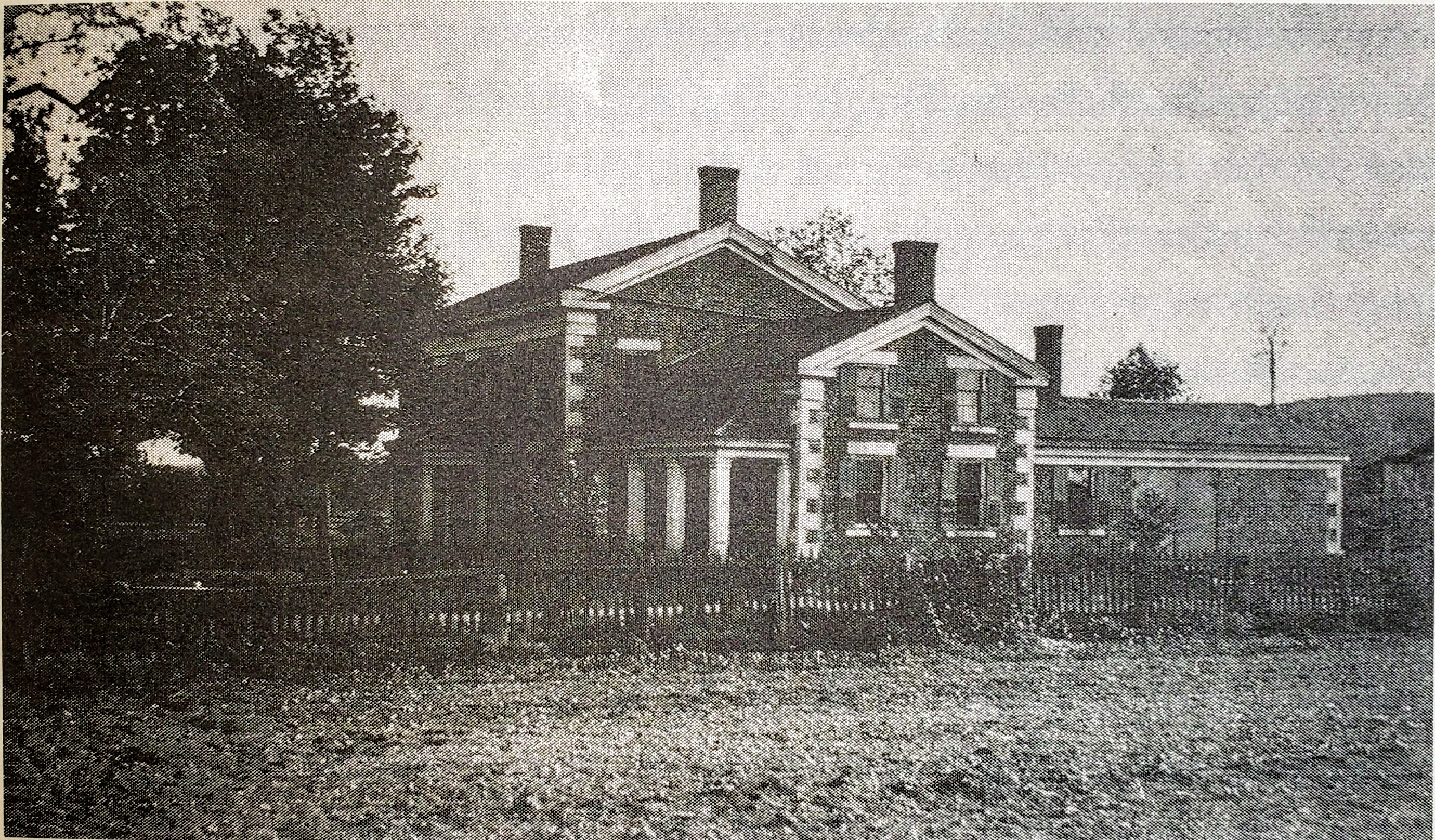
Martin and Lucy Harris home in Palmyra Township, Wayne County, New York.

Because Harris wanted assurance of the Book of Mormon's authenticity, Smith transcribed characters from the golden plates to a piece of paper, perhaps the one now known as the Anthon transcript, but there is much to cast doubt on this document being the original as both Harris's and Anthon's accounts describe it differently. In the winter of 1828, Harris took the transcript of characters to New York City, where he met with Charles Anthon, a professor of linguistics at Columbia College. The two men's accounts of the meeting conflict on almost every point. Harris's account is recorded in Smith's History of the Church. According to the account, Harris said that Anthon gave him a certificate verifying the authenticity of the characters and the translations, but that when Anthon learned that Smith claimed to have received the plates from an angel, he took the certificate back and tore it to pieces. Anthon, for his part, gave written accounts in 1834 and 1841. Despite the years in between, both accounts are in good agreement, but there is a contradiction as to whether he had given Harris a written opinion about the transcript or not. In both accounts, Anthon maintained that he told Harris that he (Harris) was a victim of a fraud and not to get involved. In either case, the episode apparently satisfied Harris's doubts about the authenticity of the golden plates and the translation enough to mortgage his farm to have the book printed. Harris's wife continued to oppose his collaboration with Smith.

In both of Anthon's accounts, he states that Harris visited him again after the Book of Mormon was printed and brought him a copy, which Anthon refused to accept. Anthon records that he again advised Harris he had been defrauded and should go straight home and ask to examine the plates locked in the chest, but Harris responded that he could not look at the plates or he and his family would be cursed.

=== Scribe to Joseph Smith ===
In February 1828, Harris traveled to Harmony, Pennsylvania to serve as a scribe while Smith dictated the translation of the golden plates. By June 1828, Smith and Harris's work on the translation had resulted in 116 pages of manuscript.

Harris asked Smith for permission to take the 116 pages of manuscript back to his wife to convince her of its authenticity; Smith reluctantly agreed. After Harris had shown the pages to his wife and some others, the manuscript disappeared while he was serving jury duty. The loss temporarily halted the translation of the plates, and when Smith began again, he used other scribes, primarily Oliver Cowdery.

The first extant written revelation to Joseph Smith, dated July 1828, refers to Smith's delivering the 116 pages to Harris. Addressing Smith, the revelation says: "thou deliveredst up that which was sacred, into the hands of a wicked man, who has set at nought the counsels of God, and has broken the most sacred promises, which were made before God, and has depended upon his own judgement, and boasted in his own wisdom."

=== Book of Mormon financier ===
Nevertheless, Harris continued to support Smith financially. The translation was completed in June 1829. By August, Smith contracted with publisher E. B. Grandin of Palmyra to print the Book of Mormon. Harris mortgaged his farm to Grandin to ensure payment of the printing costs, and he later sold 151 acres (61 ha) of his farm to pay off the mortgage. In March of 1830, Smith announced a revelation to Harris: "I command you, that thou shalt not covet thine own property, but impart freely to the printing of the book of Mormon." He warned, "Misery thou shalt receive, if thou wilt slight these counsels: Yea, even destruction of thyself and property. Impart a portion of thy property; Yea, even a part of thy lands and all save the support of thy family. Pay the printer's debt." Harris gave Grandin's printing office $3,000 (equivalent to $91,000 in 2025) for the Book of Mormon to be published and available for purchase shortly thereafter.

=== Witness to the golden plates ===
As the translation neared completion, Joseph Smith said he received a revelation from God that three men would be called as special witnesses to the existence of the golden plates. Harris, along with Oliver Cowdery and David Whitmer, was chosen as one of the Three Witnesses.

In the words of David Whitmer, one of the other two witnesses, "It was in the latter part of June, 1829... Joseph, Oliver Cowdery and myself were together, and the angel showed them [the plates] to us.... [We were] sitting on a log when we were overshadowed by a light more glorious than that of the sun. In the midst of this light, but a few feet from us, appeared a table upon which were many golden plates, also the sword of Laban and the directors. I saw them as plain as I see you now, and distinctly heard the voice of the Lord declaring that the records of the plates of the Book of Mormon were translated by the gift and power of God."

Joseph Smith and Martin Harris had a similar experience, and as the manuscript was prepared for printing, Cowdery, Whitmer, and Harris signed a joint statement that has been included in each of the more than 120 million copies of the Book of Mormon printed since then. It reads in part:

"And we declare with words of soberness, that an angel of God came down from heaven, and he brought and laid before our eyes, that we beheld and saw the plates, and the engravings thereon; and we know that it is by the grace of God the Father, and our Lord Jesus Christ, that we beheld and bear record that these things are true."

In 1839, Smith indicated that Harris's experience in seeing the plates occurred separately from that of Whitmer and Cowdery. The Three Witnesses's attestation was printed with the book, and it has been included in nearly every subsequent edition.

=== Marital conflict ===
In part because of their continued disagreement over the legitimacy of Smith and the golden plates, and because of the loss of his farm, Harris and his wife separated. Lucy Harris was described by Lucy Mack Smith as having an "irascible temper." Lucy Harris wrote that Martin Harris had beaten her "at different times." She is the only known source of the claim that her husband may have committed adultery with a neighboring "Mrs. Haggard."

== High Priest ==
Harris was baptized by Oliver Cowdrey into the Church of Christ, which Smith organized, in Fayette, New York on April 6, 1830, the same day that it was organized.

In 1830, Harris prophesied, '"Jackson would be the last president that we would have; and that all persons who did not embrace Mormonism in two years' time would be stricken off the face of the earth.' He said that Palmyra was to be the New Jerusalem, and that her streets were to be paved with gold."(Gilbert 1892).

On June 3, 1831, at a conference at the headquarters of the church in Kirtland, Ohio, Harris was ordained to the office of high priest and the next year, he began service as a missionary in the northeastern Pennsylvania, and southern New York with his older brother Emner Harris. Together, they founded a church in Springfield, Pennsylvania, and according to Emner, baptized 82 new members in their first year. However, in December 1832, a woman in Springfield sued Harris for slander, alleging that he told a crowd in a public square that "she had a bastard child". In January of the next year, he was arrested for it, and spent the next two weeks in jail until friends posted the $1,000 bail (The same amount that he was being sued for). He and Emner returned to Ohio in mid 1833, and the court meanwhile found him not liable.

On February 12, 1834, Sidney Rigdon charged Harris before the Kirtland High Council, then the chief judicial and legislative council of the church. Among the charges was the allegation that Harris had "told Edqr. A.C. Russell that Joseph drank too much liquor when he was translating the Book of Mormon and that he wrestled with many men and threw them &c. Another charge was, that he exalted himself above Bro. Joseph, in that he said Bro. Joseph knew not the contents of the Book of Mormon until after it was translated." Harris claimed innocence, though he reportedly admitted that he "had said many things inadvertently calculating to wound the feelings of his brother and promised to do better. The council forgave him and gave him much good advice."

On February 17, 1834, Harris was ordained a member of Kirtland High Council. In response to the conflicts between Mormons and non-Mormons in Missouri, Harris joined what is now known as Zion's Camp and marched from Kirtland to Clay County, Missouri. Afterwards, Harris, along with Oliver Cowdery and David Whitmer, selected and ordained a "traveling High Council" of 12 men that eventually became the Quorum of the Twelve Apostles. (Some early church leaders claimed that Harris, like Smith and Cowdery, was ordained to the priesthood office of apostle; but there is no record of this ordination, and neither Harris nor Cowdery was ever a member of the Quorum of the Twelve Apostles.)

=== Marriage to Caroline Young ===
Lucy and Martin Harris separated in 1830, and Lucy died in the summer of 1836. On November 1, 1836, Harris married Caroline Young, the 22-year-old daughter of Brigham Young's brother, John. The officiator was Heber C. Kimball. Harris was 31 years older than his new wife; they had seven children together.

== Split with Joseph Smith ==
In 1837, dissension arose in Kirtland over the failure of the church's Kirtland Safety Society bank. Harris called it a "fraud" and was among the dissenters who broke with Smith and attempted to reorganize the church, led by Warren Parrish. Smith and Rigdon relocated to Far West, Missouri. In December 1837, Smith and the Kirtland High Council excommunicated 28 individuals, Harris among them.

In 1838, Smith called the Three Witnesses (Cowdery, Harris, and Whitmer) "too mean to mention; and we had liked to have forgotten them." Parrish's church in Kirtland took control of the temple and became known as The Church of Christ. In its 1838 articles of incorporation, Harris was named one of the church's three trustees, and he bought a hundred-acre farm in Kirtland a mile south of the temple. He left when Parrish started denouncing the Book of Mormon.

In June 1841, the Painesville Telegraph reported, "Martin Harris believes that the work in its commencement was a genuine work of the Lord, but that Smith, having become worldly and proud, has been forsaken of the Lord, and has become a knave and impostor. He expects that the work will be yet revived, through other instrumentalities."

Harris was rebaptized into the Church of Jesus Christ of Latter Day Saints in 1842, though he did not gather with church members to its headquarters in Nauvoo, Illinois.

=== After Smith's death ===
After the killing of Joseph Smith, Harris remained in Kirtland and accepted James Strang as Mormonism's new prophet, one who claimed to have another set of supernatural plates and witnesses to authenticate them. In August 1846, Harris traveled on a mission to England for the Strangite church, but the Mormon conference there declined to hear him. When he insisted on preaching outside the building, police removed him.

By 1847, Harris had broken with Strang and accepted the leadership claims of fellow Book of Mormon witness David Whitmer. Mormon apostle William E. McLellin organized a Whitmerite congregation in Kirtland, and Harris became a member. By 1851, Harris had accepted another Latter Day Saint factional leader, Gladden Bishop, as prophet and joined Bishop's Kirtland-based organization. In 1855, Harris joined with the last surviving brother of Joseph Smith, William Smith and declared that William was Joseph's true successor. Harris was also briefly intrigued by the "Roll and Book," a scripture that had been supernaturally delivered to the Shakers. By the 1860s, all of those organizations had either dissolved or declined. In 1856, his wife Caroline Young and her children left him to gather with the Mormons in Utah Territory, where she would later marry John Catley Davis. Harris remained in Kirtland and gave tours of the temple to curious visitors.

In 1859, Harris gave an interview which described him as "an earnest and sincere advocate of the spiritual and divine authority of the Book of Mormon." It clarified that Harris "does not sympathize with Brigham Young and the Salt Lake Church. He considers them apostates from the true faith; and as being under the influence of the devil. Mr. Harris says, that the pretended church of the 'Latter Day Saints,' are in reality 'latter day devils,' and that himself and a very few others are the only genuine Mormons left."

== Rebaptism into LDS Church ==
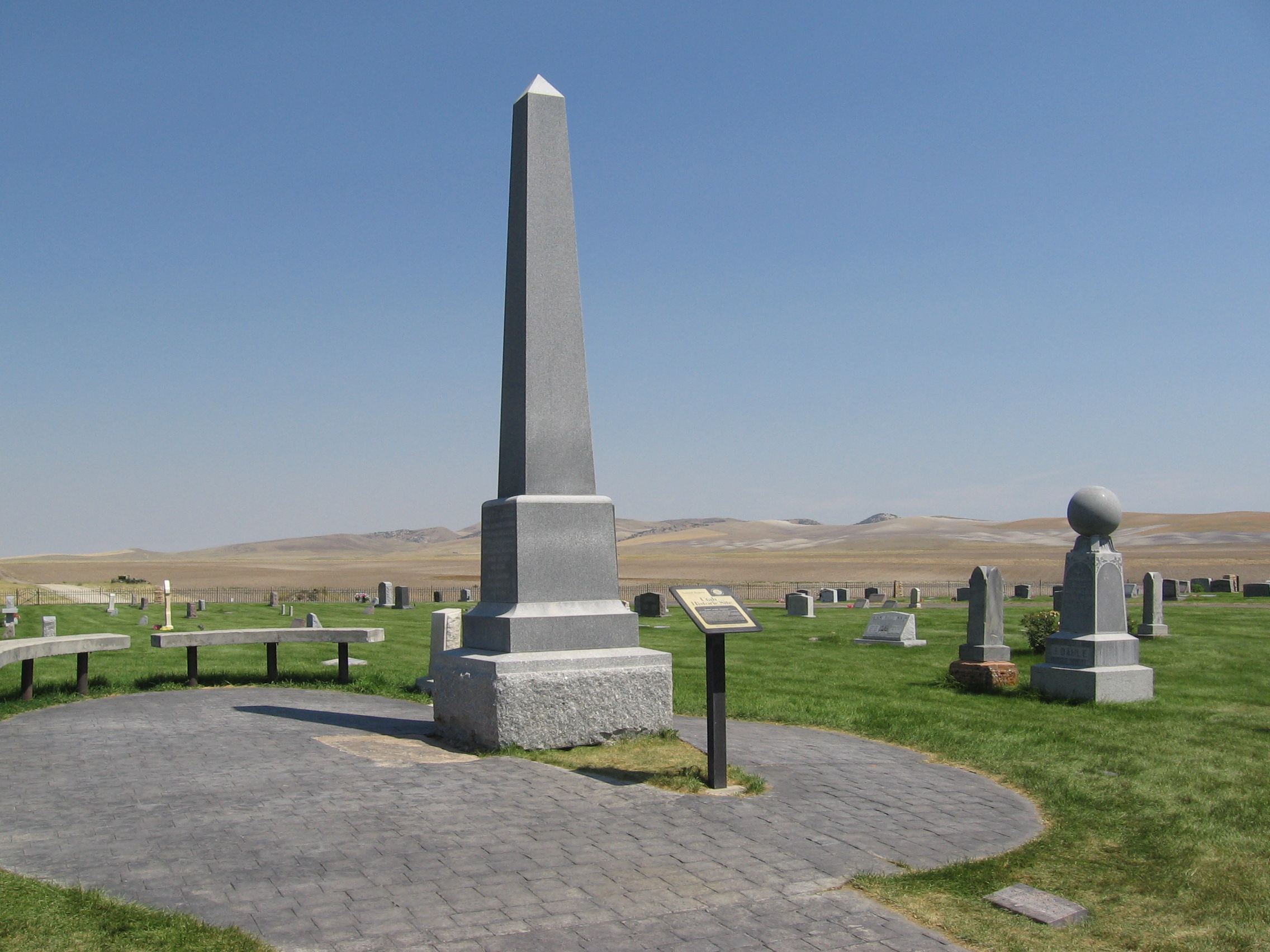
The Martin Harris gravesite in Clarkston, Utah is listed on the National Register of Historic Places

In 1870, at age 87, Harris moved to the Utah Territory, and, shortly afterward, was again rebaptized into the Church of Jesus Christ of Latter-day Saints (LDS Church). Harris, who had been left destitute and without a congregation in Kirtland, accepted the assistance of members of the LDS Church, who raised $200 (equivalent to $5,100 in 2025) to help him move west by train, along with his friend Edward Stevenson. On September 17th 1870, about two weeks after arriving in Utah, Harris was re baptized into the LDS Church by Stevenson in the endowment house. He then was baptized by proxy for his deceased father and brother. He would go on to give many speeches about his testimony of the Book of Mormon, including a talk during the morning session of the 1870 semiannual general conference. Harris lived the last four and a half years of his life with his eldest son by Caroline Young, Martin Harris Jr., in Cache Valley, where he would regularly receive visitors coming to meet him. He was stricken with Paralysis in November 1874, and he died one year later on July 10, 1875, in Clarkston, Utah Territory, and was buried there.

== Testimony to the Book of Mormon ==
Although he was estranged from Mormon leaders for most of his life, Harris continued to testify to the truth of the Book of Mormon. His initial written testimony as one of the three witnesses, printed in the Book of Mormon, describes a physical experience. He then often describes seeing the plates using spiritual language, and finally returns to primarily using physical or natural terminology.

=== Spiritual testimony ===
Primarily during the early years, Harris "seems to have repeatedly admitted the internal, subjective nature of his visionary experience." The foreman in the Palmyra printing office that produced the first Book of Mormon said that Harris "used to practice a good deal of his characteristic jargon and 'seeing with the spiritual eye,' and the like." John H. Gilbert, the typesetter for most of the book, said that he had asked Harris, "Martin, did you see those plates with your naked eyes?" According to Gilbert, Harris "looked down for an instant, raised his eyes up, and said, 'No, I saw them with a spiritual eye.'" Two other Palmyra residents said that Harris told them that he had seen the plates with "the eye of faith" or "spiritual eyes."

In March 1838, disillusioned church members said that Harris had publicly denied that any of the Witnesses to the Book of Mormon had ever seen or handled the golden plates—although Harris had not been present when Whitmer and Cowdery first said they had viewed them—and they stated that Harris's recantation, made during a period of crisis in early Mormonism, induced five influential members, including three apostles, to leave the church.

In April 1838, Harris is reported by one disillusioned church member to have said publicly in Ohio that "he never saw the plates with his natural eyes, only in vision or imagination." A neighbor of Harris in Kirtland, Ohio, said decades later that Harris "never claimed to have seen [the plates] with his natural eyes, only spiritual vision."

One account written years after Harris's death reports Harris at the end of his long life saying "Sometimes the plates would be on a table in the room in which Smith did the translating, covered over with cloth," but also that "While praying I passed into a state of entrancement, and in that state I saw the angel and the plates."

Although some reports suggest that Martin Harris described his experience of seeing the golden plates with a "spiritual eye" or the "eye of faith," these statements require careful contextualization. A prominent example is a statement by John A. Clark, a critic of Joseph Smith, who wrote in 1840 that an unnamed "gentleman in Palmyra" claimed Harris had said, “I did not see them [the plates] as I do that pencil-case, yet I saw them with the eye of faith”. However, this account is third-hand, anonymous, and was published years after the event. Elsewhere, Harris emphatically affirmed the literal nature of his experience, stating, “I saw the angel and the plates,” and “as sure as you see my hand so sure did I see the angel and the plates”. In 1875, Harris said that the witnesses had prayed to behold the plates with their "natural eyes, that we could testify of it to the world." His use of the terms "spiritual eye" or "eye of faith" appears to reflect scriptural language, such as that found in the Book of Mormon (Ether 12:19), where visionary experiences are described as being seen "with an eye of faith." These expressions do not necessarily imply hallucination or inner vision only; rather, they illustrate a blend of spiritual and physical perception common in religious experiences. Harris's consistent public testimony affirmed that he saw the plates and the angel, and he never recanted this claim.

=== Physical testimony ===
Harris includes a physical and spiritual witness of the plates. Even during his 1838 disillusionment, he corrected other dissenters regarding his physical witness of the plates: "Harris arose & said he was sorry for any man who rejected the Book of Mormon for he knew it was true, he said he had hefted the plates repeatedly in a box with only a tablecloth or a handkerchief over them".

In 1853, Harris told David Dille that he had held the forty- to sixty-pound plates on his knee for "an hour-and-a-half" and handled the plates with his hands, "plate after plate." Even later, Harris affirmed that he had seen the plates and the angel: "Gentlemen," holding out his hand, "do you see that hand? Are you sure you see it? Or are your eyes playing you a trick or something? No. Well, as sure as you see my hand so sure did I see the Angel and the plates." The following year Harris affirmed that "No man heard me in any way deny the truth of the Book of Mormon [or] the administration of the angel that showed me the plates."

At the end of his life, Harris responded when he was asked if he still believed in Smith and the Book of Mormon: "Do I believe it! Do you see the sun shining! Just as surely as the sun is shining on us and gives us light, and the [moon] and stars give us light by night, just as surely as the breath of life sustains us, so surely do I know that Joseph Smith was a true prophet of God, chosen of God to open the last dispensation of the fulness of times; so surely do I know that the Book of Mormon was divinely translated. I saw the plates; I saw the Angel; I heard the voice of God. I know that the Book of Mormon is true and that Joseph Smith was a true prophet of God. I might as well doubt my own existence as to doubt the divine authenticity of the Book of Mormon or the divine calling of Joseph Smith."

On his death bed, Harris said: "The Book of Mormon is no fake. I know what I know. I have seen what I have seen and I have heard what I have heard. I have seen the gold plates from which the Book of Mormon is written. An angel appeared to me and others and testified to the truthfulness of the record, and had I been willing to have perjured myself and sworn falsely to the testimony I now bear I could have been a rich man, but I could not have testified other than I have done and am now doing for these things are true."

== See also ==
- All About Mormons
- Clarkston Pageant
