= Utah...This Is the Place =

Regional anthem of the U.S. state of Utah

- State song of Utah
- Lyrics: Sam and Gary Francis, 1996
- Music: Sam and Gary Francis, 1996
- Adopted: 2003; 23 years ago

"Utah...This Is the Place" is the state song of the U.S. state of Utah. It was written in 1996 by Sam and Gary Francis for Utah's centennial celebrations. It replaced "Utah, We Love Thee" as the state song in 2003, after 4th grade students at Cook Elementary wanted a song that was fun to sing. The students talked to their local state representative, Dana Love, and she drafted a bill that passed the state legislature on 28 February 2003, and was signed by then Utah Governor Mike Leavitt on 15 March 2003. The previous song, "Utah, We Love Thee", became the State Hymn.

This song was placed in the public domain by the composers when it was made the state song of Utah. The song is referenced imprecisely in official publications variously by the names "Utah, This is the Place" and "Utah This is the Place". Though the Utah-themed children's album on which the song has been published by its writers is named "Utah, This Is This Place", the song itself is named "Utah...This Is the Place".

== Lyrics ==
Utah! People working together
Utah! What a great place to be.
Blessed from Heaven above.
It's the land that we love.
This is the place!

Utah! With its mountains and valleys.
Utah! With its canyons and streams.
You can go anywhere.
But there's none that compare.
This is the place!

It was Brigham Young who led the pioneers across the plains.
They suffered with the trials they had to face.
With faith they kept on going till they reached the Great Salt Lake
Here they heard the words, "This is the place!"

Utah! With its focus on family,
Utah! Helps each child to succeed.
People care how they live.
Each has so much to give.
This is the place!

Utah! Getting bigger and better.
Utah! Always leading the way.
New technology's here...
Growing faster each year.
This is the place!

There is beauty in the snow-capped mountains, in the lakes and streams.
There are valleys filled with farms and orchards too.
The spirit of its people shows in everything they do.
Utah is the place where dreams come true.

Utah! With its pioneer spirit.
Utah! What a great legacy!
Blessed from Heaven above.
It's the land that we love.
This is the place,

Utah! Utah! Utah!
This is the place!

== See also ==
- Mormon handcart pioneers
- Mormon pioneers
- Mormon Trail
- Pioneer Day (Utah)
- This Is the Place Heritage Park
- This Is the Place Monument
