= Martin Harris Gravesite =

- U.S. National Register of Historic Places
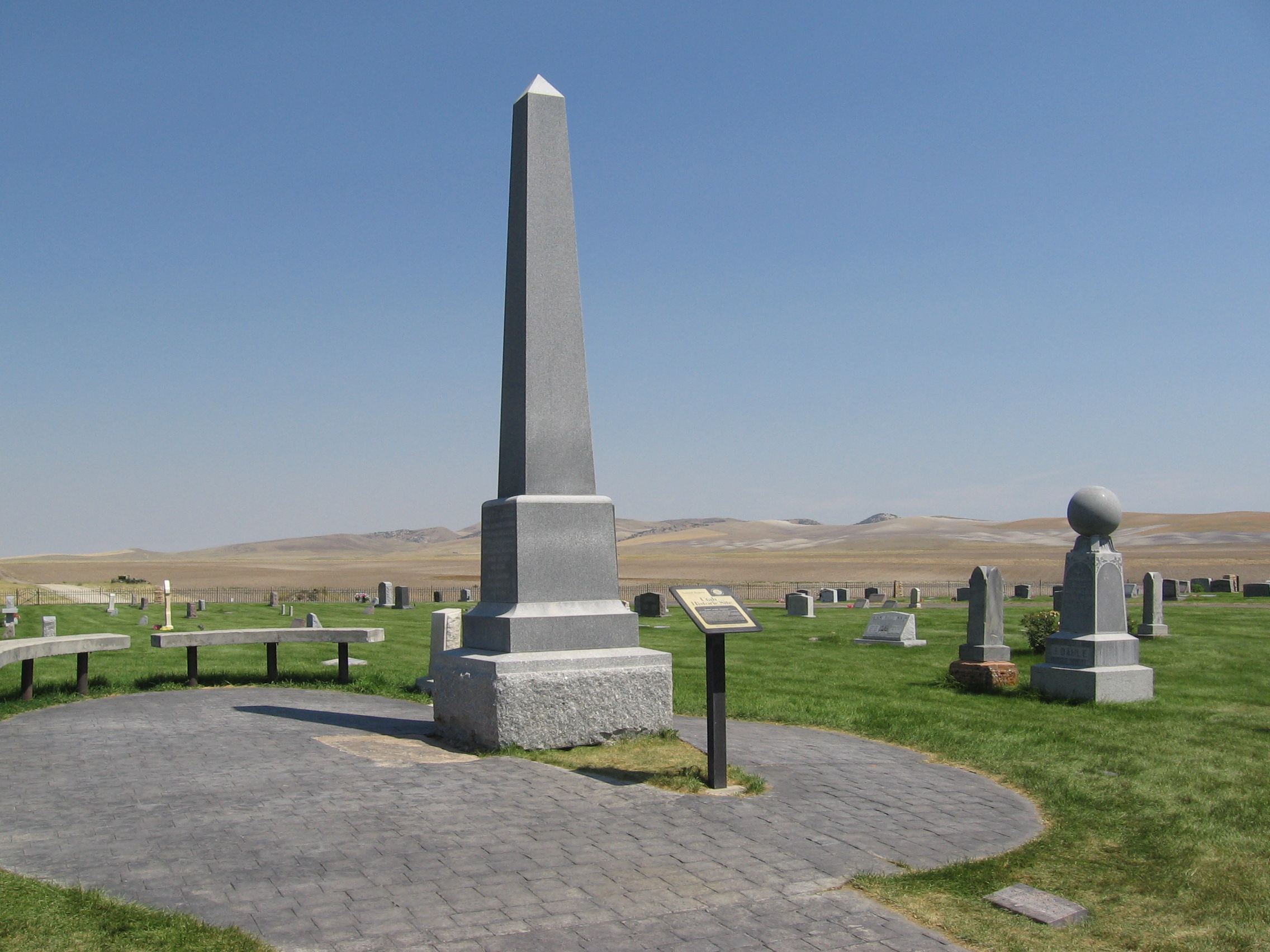

- Location within Utah Location within the United States
- Nearest city: Clarkston, Utah
- Coordinates: 41°55′53″N 112°02′20″W
- Area: less than one acre
- Built: 1875
- NRHP reference No.: 80003890
- Added to NRHP: November 28, 1980

The Martin Harris Gravesite, in a cemetery in Cache County, Utah overlooking the town of Clarkston, Utah, is a gravesite from 1875 with a monument placed in 1925. It was listed on the National Register of Historic Places in 1980.

The site is the grave of Martin Harris (1783–1875), one of three witnesses to the golden plates received by Joseph Smith. Harris served as the first scribe to Smith in translating the plates to write the Book of Mormon. In 1870, at the age of 87, he traveled by train to Utah, and would be re-baptized there, and spend the rest of his life in Cache County. He was buried with a copy of the Book of Mormon in his right hand, and a Doctrine and Covenants in his left. The monument is 18 feet (5.5 m) tall and was dedicated by Church of Jesus Christ of Latter-day Saints president Heber J. Grant in 1925.

The monument is engraved with the statement:

Martin Harris one of the three witnesses to the Divine authenticity of the Book of Mormon. Born Easttown, Saratoga County, New York, May 18, 1783. Died Clarkston, Utah July 10, 1875.

It is the only known site in Utah associated with Harris.
