= Ethan Allen Andrews (lexicographer) =

American lexicographer and educator

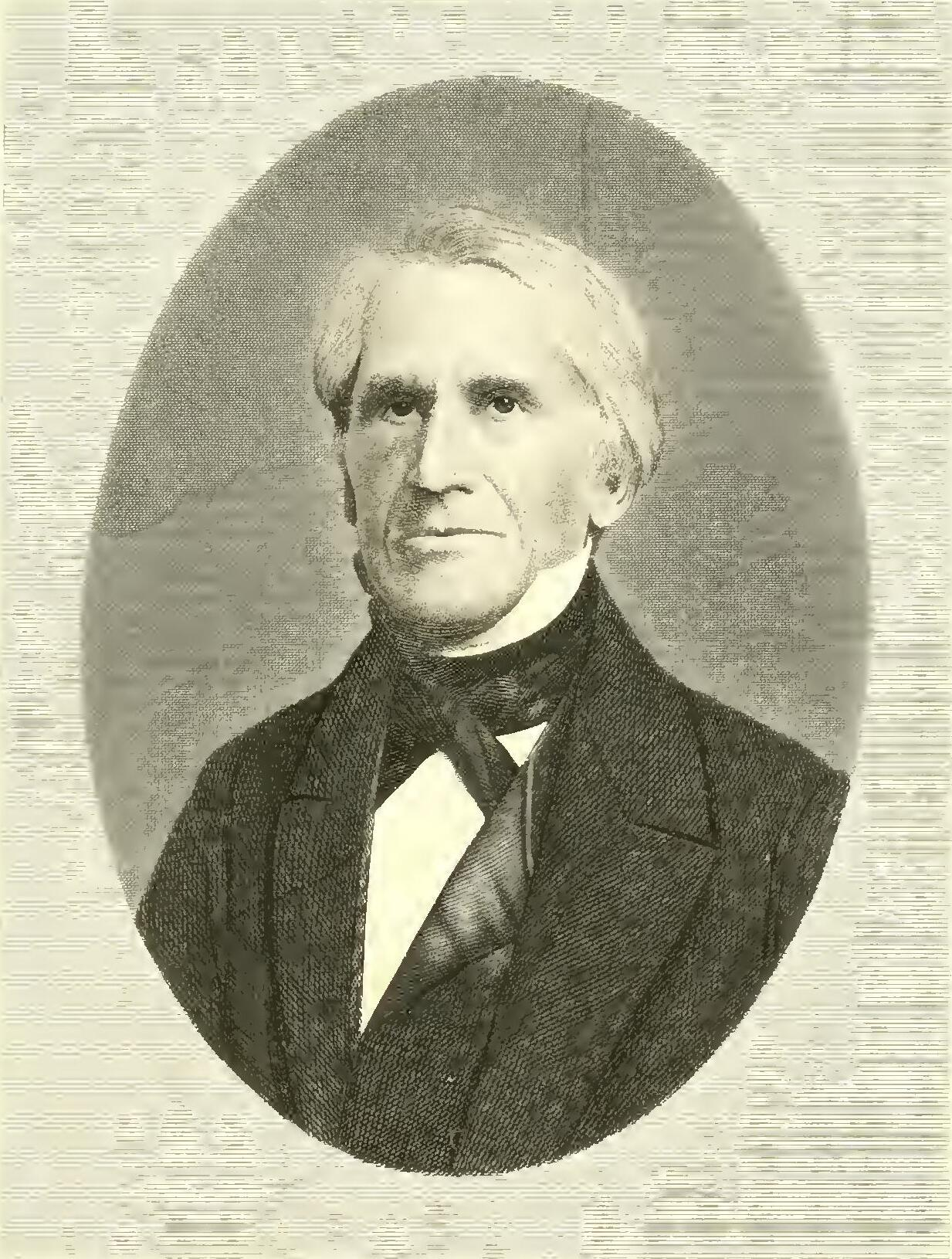
- Born: April 7, 1787; New Britain
- Died: March 4, 1858; New Britain
- Education: Yale University
- Occupations: Lexicographer, writer, lawyer

Ethan Allen Andrews (April 7, 1787 – March 4, 1858) was an American lexicographer and educator. He published a major Latin dictionary in 1850 and served in the Connecticut House of Representatives in 1851 and was a Whig.

== Life ==
Andrews was born in New Britain, Connecticut, and graduated with an A.B. at Yale in 1810. He practiced law for several years, then (1822–1828) was professor of ancient languages at the University of North Carolina, after which he taught at New Haven and Boston. He married Lucy Cowles Andrews, with whom he had one son, Horace.

He died on March 4, 1858, in New Britain.

== Works ==
He published a number of Latin textbooks and in 1850 a Latin-English lexicon, a reduced version of Wilhelm Freund's German translation of Egidio Forcellini's 1771 dictionary, which became known as Andrews' Lexicon. It went through many revisions and came to be known as Harper's Latin Dictionary (1907). In 1836, he published a Latin grammar with his Yale classmate Solomon Stoddard. A monograph, Slavery and the Domestic Slave Trade in the United States, was printed in Boston in 1836. Other publications include "First Latin Book"; "Latin Reader"; "Viri Romae"; "Latin Lessons"; "Andrews' and Stoddard's Latin Grammar"; "Synopsis of Latin Grammar"; "Questions on the Latin Grammar"; "Latin Exercises"; "Key to Latin Exercises"; "Exercises in Latin Etymology"; "Caesar's Commentaries"; "Sallust"; and "Ovid".

=== Books ===
- Slavery and the Domestic Slave Trade in the United States (Boston, 1836)

=== Edited volumes ===
- Leisure Hours: A Choice Collection of Readings in Prose (Boston, 1844)

=== Reference works ===
- A Copious and Critical Latin-English Lexicon Founded on the Larger Latin-German Lexicon of Dr. Wilhelm Freund (New York, 1851)

=== Textbooks ===
- A Grammar of the Latin Language for Use of Schools and Colleges with Solomon Stoddard (Boston, 1836)
- Questions upon Andrews' and Stoddard's Latin Grammar (Boston and New York, 1836)
- First Lessons in Latin (New York and Boston, 1837)
- The First Part of Jacobs and Doring's Latin Reader (Boston, 1837)
- Latin Exercises (Boston, 1837)
- A Key to Latin Exercises (Boston, 1837)
- A First Latin Book or Progressive Lessons in Reading and Writing Latin (Boston, 1846)
- A Synopsis of Latin Grammar (Boston, 1851)
- Exercises in Latin Etymology (Boston, 1855)
- A Manual of Latin Grammar (Boston, 1859)

=== Translations ===
- Sallust's History of the War against Jugurtha, and of the Conspiracy of Catiline (New Haven, 1841)
- Lhomond's Virie Romae (Boston, 1842)
- C. Julius Caeser's Commentaries on the Gallic War (Boston, 1846)

== Reception ==
The Liberator wrote a scathing review of his slavery book, describing it as a deceitful pro-slavery panegyric, commenting, "Now, what are those 'opinions' of Mr. T. which are 'essentially' erroneous, i.e. if those of this letter writer are 'essentially' right? Mr. T. believes that the enslavement of our colored population is a sin against God; that, like every other sin, it ought to be repented of and abandoned instantly; that the command of God is binding upon every oppressor to-day, to undo the heavy burdens, break every yoke, and let the oppressed go free; that equal rights and privileges belong to men, independent of the color of their skin or the texture of their hair; and that light and truth ought to have free course all ever our land, and throughout the world. He holds no other opinions that conflict with these. Yet these are 'essentially' different from Prof. A. E, and, consequently, from those which are sanctioned by the American Union, for they agree with him in his sentiments."
