= Wilhelm Freund =

German philologist (1806–1894)

Wilhelm Freund (January 27, 1806 – June 4, 1894) was a German Jewish philologist, born at Kępno.

He received his education at Berlin and Breslau. For twenty years he was chiefly engaged in private tuition, but from 1855 to 1870, he was director of the Jewish school at Gleiwitz (Gliwice) in Upper Silesia. He retired to Breslau (Wrocław) in order to devote himself to his literary pursuits. Besides classical school-books and some works on philology, he compiled an elaborate Latin dictionary in 4 volumes, the Wörterbuch der Lateinischen Sprache (1834–45), which was the basis of the standard English-Latin dictionaries in the 19th century. It was translated into English by Ethan Allen Andrews in 1850 and revised (with Freund's own assistance) as the basis for Lewis and Short's A Latin Dictionary. He also wrote:

- Wie studiert man Philologie (sixth edition by Dieter, Stuttgart, 1903).
- Tafeln der Litteraturgeschichte (1877).
- Triennium Philologicum (third edition, 1906 et seq.).
- Präparationen zu den griechischen und römischen Klassikern, (a long work beginning in 1859)
- Wanderungen auf klassischem Boden (1889–92).

In addition to his work in philology, Freund was involved in Jewish education and in political activism for the rights of the Jewish community in the Kingdom of Prussia, and the Judengesetz of 1847 was in great measure the result of his efforts. He died in Breslau.
